

355001–355100 

|-bgcolor=#E9E9E9
| 355001 ||  || — || August 17, 2006 || Palomar || NEAT || — || align=right | 2.2 km || 
|-id=002 bgcolor=#E9E9E9
| 355002 ||  || — || August 18, 2006 || Anderson Mesa || LONEOS || ADE || align=right | 2.4 km || 
|-id=003 bgcolor=#E9E9E9
| 355003 ||  || — || August 18, 2006 || Anderson Mesa || LONEOS || EUN || align=right | 1.4 km || 
|-id=004 bgcolor=#E9E9E9
| 355004 ||  || — || August 21, 2006 || Socorro || LINEAR || — || align=right | 2.3 km || 
|-id=005 bgcolor=#E9E9E9
| 355005 ||  || — || August 22, 2006 || Palomar || NEAT || — || align=right | 3.1 km || 
|-id=006 bgcolor=#fefefe
| 355006 ||  || — || August 21, 2006 || Socorro || LINEAR || H || align=right data-sort-value="0.93" | 930 m || 
|-id=007 bgcolor=#d6d6d6
| 355007 ||  || — || August 23, 2006 || Pla D'Arguines || R. Ferrando || — || align=right | 2.3 km || 
|-id=008 bgcolor=#d6d6d6
| 355008 ||  || — || August 18, 2006 || Kitt Peak || Spacewatch || BRA || align=right | 2.1 km || 
|-id=009 bgcolor=#E9E9E9
| 355009 ||  || — || August 19, 2006 || Kitt Peak || Spacewatch || AEO || align=right | 1.0 km || 
|-id=010 bgcolor=#E9E9E9
| 355010 ||  || — || August 20, 2006 || Palomar || NEAT || — || align=right | 2.0 km || 
|-id=011 bgcolor=#E9E9E9
| 355011 ||  || — || August 24, 2006 || Palomar || NEAT || — || align=right | 1.1 km || 
|-id=012 bgcolor=#E9E9E9
| 355012 ||  || — || August 24, 2006 || Palomar || NEAT || — || align=right | 1.5 km || 
|-id=013 bgcolor=#E9E9E9
| 355013 ||  || — || August 24, 2006 || Haleakala || NEAT || — || align=right | 3.8 km || 
|-id=014 bgcolor=#E9E9E9
| 355014 ||  || — || August 27, 2006 || Kitt Peak || Spacewatch || — || align=right | 2.2 km || 
|-id=015 bgcolor=#E9E9E9
| 355015 ||  || — || August 19, 2006 || Kitt Peak || Spacewatch || — || align=right | 3.3 km || 
|-id=016 bgcolor=#E9E9E9
| 355016 ||  || — || August 27, 2006 || Kitt Peak || Spacewatch || — || align=right | 2.4 km || 
|-id=017 bgcolor=#E9E9E9
| 355017 ||  || — || August 28, 2006 || Catalina || CSS || AGN || align=right | 1.4 km || 
|-id=018 bgcolor=#E9E9E9
| 355018 ||  || — || August 24, 2006 || Socorro || LINEAR || — || align=right | 2.6 km || 
|-id=019 bgcolor=#E9E9E9
| 355019 ||  || — || August 27, 2006 || Anderson Mesa || LONEOS || — || align=right | 3.8 km || 
|-id=020 bgcolor=#E9E9E9
| 355020 ||  || — || August 27, 2006 || Anderson Mesa || LONEOS || — || align=right | 1.7 km || 
|-id=021 bgcolor=#E9E9E9
| 355021 ||  || — || August 31, 2006 || Eskridge || Farpoint Obs. || — || align=right | 1.7 km || 
|-id=022 bgcolor=#fefefe
| 355022 Triman ||  ||  || August 31, 2006 || Ottmarsheim || C. Rinner || H || align=right | 1.1 km || 
|-id=023 bgcolor=#d6d6d6
| 355023 ||  || — || August 18, 2006 || Kitt Peak || Spacewatch || — || align=right | 2.8 km || 
|-id=024 bgcolor=#E9E9E9
| 355024 ||  || — || August 19, 2006 || Kitt Peak || Spacewatch || PAD || align=right | 1.7 km || 
|-id=025 bgcolor=#d6d6d6
| 355025 ||  || — || August 30, 2006 || Anderson Mesa || LONEOS || BRA || align=right | 1.3 km || 
|-id=026 bgcolor=#E9E9E9
| 355026 ||  || — || August 31, 2006 || Črni Vrh || Črni Vrh || — || align=right | 3.8 km || 
|-id=027 bgcolor=#d6d6d6
| 355027 ||  || — || August 28, 2006 || Apache Point || A. C. Becker || KOR || align=right | 1.2 km || 
|-id=028 bgcolor=#E9E9E9
| 355028 ||  || — || August 18, 2006 || Palomar || NEAT || MIS || align=right | 3.2 km || 
|-id=029 bgcolor=#E9E9E9
| 355029 Herve ||  ||  || September 1, 2006 || Ottmarsheim || C. Rinner || — || align=right | 3.0 km || 
|-id=030 bgcolor=#fefefe
| 355030 ||  || — || September 12, 2006 || Socorro || LINEAR || — || align=right | 1.9 km || 
|-id=031 bgcolor=#E9E9E9
| 355031 ||  || — || September 15, 2006 || Kitt Peak || Spacewatch || AST || align=right | 1.9 km || 
|-id=032 bgcolor=#E9E9E9
| 355032 ||  || — || May 25, 2006 || Mount Lemmon || Mount Lemmon Survey || — || align=right | 2.4 km || 
|-id=033 bgcolor=#E9E9E9
| 355033 ||  || — || September 14, 2006 || Kitt Peak || Spacewatch || EUN || align=right | 1.2 km || 
|-id=034 bgcolor=#d6d6d6
| 355034 ||  || — || September 14, 2006 || Kitt Peak || Spacewatch || KOR || align=right | 1.4 km || 
|-id=035 bgcolor=#E9E9E9
| 355035 ||  || — || September 14, 2006 || Kitt Peak || Spacewatch || — || align=right | 2.1 km || 
|-id=036 bgcolor=#d6d6d6
| 355036 ||  || — || September 14, 2006 || Catalina || CSS || — || align=right | 2.5 km || 
|-id=037 bgcolor=#E9E9E9
| 355037 ||  || — || September 15, 2006 || Kitt Peak || Spacewatch || — || align=right | 2.4 km || 
|-id=038 bgcolor=#E9E9E9
| 355038 ||  || — || September 15, 2006 || Kitt Peak || Spacewatch || — || align=right | 2.0 km || 
|-id=039 bgcolor=#E9E9E9
| 355039 ||  || — || September 15, 2006 || Kitt Peak || Spacewatch || HOF || align=right | 2.3 km || 
|-id=040 bgcolor=#E9E9E9
| 355040 ||  || — || September 14, 2006 || Palomar || NEAT || — || align=right | 2.4 km || 
|-id=041 bgcolor=#E9E9E9
| 355041 ||  || — || September 19, 2006 || Kitt Peak || Spacewatch || — || align=right | 2.1 km || 
|-id=042 bgcolor=#d6d6d6
| 355042 ||  || — || September 14, 2006 || Mauna Kea || J. Masiero || — || align=right | 1.8 km || 
|-id=043 bgcolor=#E9E9E9
| 355043 ||  || — || September 16, 2006 || Anderson Mesa || LONEOS || — || align=right | 2.4 km || 
|-id=044 bgcolor=#E9E9E9
| 355044 ||  || — || September 17, 2006 || Socorro || LINEAR || — || align=right | 2.8 km || 
|-id=045 bgcolor=#E9E9E9
| 355045 ||  || — || September 17, 2006 || Kitt Peak || Spacewatch || EUN || align=right | 1.8 km || 
|-id=046 bgcolor=#FFC2E0
| 355046 ||  || — || September 18, 2006 || Siding Spring || SSS || APO || align=right data-sort-value="0.43" | 430 m || 
|-id=047 bgcolor=#E9E9E9
| 355047 ||  || — || August 29, 2006 || Kitt Peak || Spacewatch || — || align=right | 1.8 km || 
|-id=048 bgcolor=#E9E9E9
| 355048 ||  || — || September 18, 2006 || Catalina || CSS || — || align=right | 4.0 km || 
|-id=049 bgcolor=#E9E9E9
| 355049 ||  || — || September 19, 2006 || Catalina || CSS || — || align=right | 2.0 km || 
|-id=050 bgcolor=#d6d6d6
| 355050 ||  || — || September 19, 2006 || Kitt Peak || Spacewatch || KOR || align=right | 1.2 km || 
|-id=051 bgcolor=#E9E9E9
| 355051 ||  || — || September 19, 2006 || Kitt Peak || Spacewatch || HOF || align=right | 4.7 km || 
|-id=052 bgcolor=#E9E9E9
| 355052 ||  || — || September 18, 2006 || Kitt Peak || Spacewatch || — || align=right | 2.8 km || 
|-id=053 bgcolor=#E9E9E9
| 355053 ||  || — || September 18, 2006 || Kitt Peak || Spacewatch || AGN || align=right | 1.2 km || 
|-id=054 bgcolor=#d6d6d6
| 355054 ||  || — || September 15, 2006 || Kitt Peak || Spacewatch || KOR || align=right | 1.2 km || 
|-id=055 bgcolor=#E9E9E9
| 355055 ||  || — || August 28, 2006 || Lulin Observatory || Lulin Obs. || GEF || align=right | 2.4 km || 
|-id=056 bgcolor=#d6d6d6
| 355056 ||  || — || September 19, 2006 || Kitt Peak || Spacewatch || — || align=right | 2.2 km || 
|-id=057 bgcolor=#E9E9E9
| 355057 ||  || — || September 19, 2006 || Kitt Peak || Spacewatch || EUN || align=right | 1.5 km || 
|-id=058 bgcolor=#d6d6d6
| 355058 ||  || — || September 23, 2006 || Kitt Peak || Spacewatch || — || align=right | 2.0 km || 
|-id=059 bgcolor=#E9E9E9
| 355059 ||  || — || September 23, 2006 || Kitt Peak || Spacewatch || HOF || align=right | 2.7 km || 
|-id=060 bgcolor=#E9E9E9
| 355060 ||  || — || September 25, 2006 || Kitt Peak || Spacewatch || — || align=right | 2.0 km || 
|-id=061 bgcolor=#E9E9E9
| 355061 ||  || — || September 25, 2006 || Kitt Peak || Spacewatch || AGN || align=right | 1.3 km || 
|-id=062 bgcolor=#E9E9E9
| 355062 ||  || — || September 25, 2006 || Mount Lemmon || Mount Lemmon Survey || — || align=right | 1.3 km || 
|-id=063 bgcolor=#d6d6d6
| 355063 ||  || — || September 26, 2006 || Mount Lemmon || Mount Lemmon Survey || KOR || align=right data-sort-value="0.99" | 990 m || 
|-id=064 bgcolor=#E9E9E9
| 355064 ||  || — || September 26, 2006 || Kitt Peak || Spacewatch || HOF || align=right | 2.7 km || 
|-id=065 bgcolor=#E9E9E9
| 355065 ||  || — || September 26, 2006 || Mount Lemmon || Mount Lemmon Survey || — || align=right | 3.1 km || 
|-id=066 bgcolor=#d6d6d6
| 355066 ||  || — || September 15, 2006 || Kitt Peak || Spacewatch || KOR || align=right | 1.2 km || 
|-id=067 bgcolor=#d6d6d6
| 355067 ||  || — || September 18, 2006 || Catalina || CSS || — || align=right | 2.4 km || 
|-id=068 bgcolor=#d6d6d6
| 355068 ||  || — || September 27, 2006 || Kitt Peak || Spacewatch || KOR || align=right | 1.2 km || 
|-id=069 bgcolor=#E9E9E9
| 355069 ||  || — || September 25, 2006 || Mount Lemmon || Mount Lemmon Survey || — || align=right | 2.5 km || 
|-id=070 bgcolor=#E9E9E9
| 355070 ||  || — || September 25, 2006 || Mount Lemmon || Mount Lemmon Survey || HEN || align=right | 1.1 km || 
|-id=071 bgcolor=#E9E9E9
| 355071 ||  || — || September 26, 2006 || Kitt Peak || Spacewatch || — || align=right | 3.2 km || 
|-id=072 bgcolor=#E9E9E9
| 355072 ||  || — || September 26, 2006 || Mount Lemmon || Mount Lemmon Survey || — || align=right | 1.8 km || 
|-id=073 bgcolor=#E9E9E9
| 355073 ||  || — || September 16, 2006 || Kitt Peak || Spacewatch || NEM || align=right | 2.2 km || 
|-id=074 bgcolor=#d6d6d6
| 355074 ||  || — || September 26, 2006 || Mount Lemmon || Mount Lemmon Survey || — || align=right | 2.2 km || 
|-id=075 bgcolor=#E9E9E9
| 355075 ||  || — || September 26, 2006 || Kitt Peak || Spacewatch || — || align=right | 2.7 km || 
|-id=076 bgcolor=#d6d6d6
| 355076 ||  || — || September 26, 2006 || Kitt Peak || Spacewatch || — || align=right | 2.3 km || 
|-id=077 bgcolor=#E9E9E9
| 355077 ||  || — || September 28, 2006 || Catalina || CSS || — || align=right | 2.5 km || 
|-id=078 bgcolor=#E9E9E9
| 355078 ||  || — || September 27, 2006 || Mount Lemmon || Mount Lemmon Survey || AGN || align=right | 1.4 km || 
|-id=079 bgcolor=#E9E9E9
| 355079 ||  || — || September 17, 2006 || Kitt Peak || Spacewatch || HOF || align=right | 2.8 km || 
|-id=080 bgcolor=#E9E9E9
| 355080 ||  || — || September 27, 2006 || Kitt Peak || Spacewatch || — || align=right | 2.2 km || 
|-id=081 bgcolor=#E9E9E9
| 355081 ||  || — || September 28, 2006 || Kitt Peak || Spacewatch || WIT || align=right | 1.3 km || 
|-id=082 bgcolor=#d6d6d6
| 355082 ||  || — || September 28, 2006 || Kitt Peak || Spacewatch || CHA || align=right | 2.0 km || 
|-id=083 bgcolor=#d6d6d6
| 355083 ||  || — || September 28, 2006 || Kitt Peak || Spacewatch || KAR || align=right data-sort-value="0.96" | 960 m || 
|-id=084 bgcolor=#d6d6d6
| 355084 ||  || — || September 28, 2006 || Kitt Peak || Spacewatch || K-2 || align=right | 1.2 km || 
|-id=085 bgcolor=#E9E9E9
| 355085 ||  || — || September 18, 2006 || Apache Point || A. C. Becker || — || align=right | 2.6 km || 
|-id=086 bgcolor=#E9E9E9
| 355086 ||  || — || September 29, 2006 || Apache Point || A. C. Becker || GEF || align=right | 2.3 km || 
|-id=087 bgcolor=#E9E9E9
| 355087 ||  || — || September 26, 2006 || Kitt Peak || Spacewatch || — || align=right | 1.9 km || 
|-id=088 bgcolor=#E9E9E9
| 355088 ||  || — || September 17, 2006 || Kitt Peak || Spacewatch || MIT || align=right | 3.0 km || 
|-id=089 bgcolor=#d6d6d6
| 355089 ||  || — || September 25, 2006 || Catalina || CSS || — || align=right | 3.0 km || 
|-id=090 bgcolor=#E9E9E9
| 355090 ||  || — || September 19, 2006 || Catalina || CSS || — || align=right | 2.7 km || 
|-id=091 bgcolor=#d6d6d6
| 355091 ||  || — || September 30, 2006 || Mount Lemmon || Mount Lemmon Survey || KOR || align=right | 1.2 km || 
|-id=092 bgcolor=#d6d6d6
| 355092 || 2006 TX || — || October 1, 2006 || Great Shefford || P. Birtwhistle || — || align=right | 2.9 km || 
|-id=093 bgcolor=#d6d6d6
| 355093 ||  || — || October 4, 2006 || Mount Lemmon || Mount Lemmon Survey || — || align=right | 3.1 km || 
|-id=094 bgcolor=#d6d6d6
| 355094 ||  || — || October 11, 2006 || Kitt Peak || Spacewatch || CHA || align=right | 2.3 km || 
|-id=095 bgcolor=#d6d6d6
| 355095 ||  || — || October 12, 2006 || Kitt Peak || Spacewatch || — || align=right | 2.6 km || 
|-id=096 bgcolor=#d6d6d6
| 355096 ||  || — || October 12, 2006 || Kitt Peak || Spacewatch || ALA || align=right | 2.7 km || 
|-id=097 bgcolor=#d6d6d6
| 355097 ||  || — || October 12, 2006 || Kitt Peak || Spacewatch || — || align=right | 2.1 km || 
|-id=098 bgcolor=#d6d6d6
| 355098 ||  || — || October 12, 2006 || Kitt Peak || Spacewatch || — || align=right | 2.4 km || 
|-id=099 bgcolor=#d6d6d6
| 355099 ||  || — || October 13, 2006 || Kitt Peak || Spacewatch || 637 || align=right | 2.3 km || 
|-id=100 bgcolor=#d6d6d6
| 355100 ||  || — || October 13, 2006 || Kitt Peak || Spacewatch || EOS || align=right | 2.0 km || 
|}

355101–355200 

|-bgcolor=#d6d6d6
| 355101 ||  || — || October 13, 2006 || Kitt Peak || Spacewatch || — || align=right | 1.9 km || 
|-id=102 bgcolor=#d6d6d6
| 355102 ||  || — || October 13, 2006 || Kitt Peak || Spacewatch || — || align=right | 2.1 km || 
|-id=103 bgcolor=#d6d6d6
| 355103 ||  || — || September 28, 2006 || Mount Lemmon || Mount Lemmon Survey || — || align=right | 2.1 km || 
|-id=104 bgcolor=#d6d6d6
| 355104 ||  || — || October 4, 2006 || Mount Lemmon || Mount Lemmon Survey || — || align=right | 2.1 km || 
|-id=105 bgcolor=#d6d6d6
| 355105 ||  || — || October 2, 2006 || Catalina || CSS || — || align=right | 3.1 km || 
|-id=106 bgcolor=#d6d6d6
| 355106 ||  || — || September 30, 2006 || Mount Lemmon || Mount Lemmon Survey || — || align=right | 2.3 km || 
|-id=107 bgcolor=#d6d6d6
| 355107 ||  || — || October 17, 2006 || Mount Lemmon || Mount Lemmon Survey || KOR || align=right | 1.3 km || 
|-id=108 bgcolor=#d6d6d6
| 355108 ||  || — || October 16, 2006 || Kitt Peak || Spacewatch || — || align=right | 2.0 km || 
|-id=109 bgcolor=#E9E9E9
| 355109 ||  || — || October 16, 2006 || Kitt Peak || Spacewatch || HOF || align=right | 2.9 km || 
|-id=110 bgcolor=#d6d6d6
| 355110 ||  || — || October 16, 2006 || Kitt Peak || Spacewatch || — || align=right | 2.3 km || 
|-id=111 bgcolor=#d6d6d6
| 355111 ||  || — || October 16, 2006 || Kitt Peak || Spacewatch || KOR || align=right | 1.4 km || 
|-id=112 bgcolor=#d6d6d6
| 355112 ||  || — || October 19, 2006 || Kitt Peak || Spacewatch || — || align=right | 2.6 km || 
|-id=113 bgcolor=#E9E9E9
| 355113 ||  || — || October 18, 2006 || Nyukasa || Mount Nyukasa Stn. || — || align=right | 2.7 km || 
|-id=114 bgcolor=#d6d6d6
| 355114 ||  || — || October 16, 2006 || Catalina || CSS || — || align=right | 2.6 km || 
|-id=115 bgcolor=#d6d6d6
| 355115 ||  || — || October 17, 2006 || Mount Lemmon || Mount Lemmon Survey || K-2 || align=right | 1.6 km || 
|-id=116 bgcolor=#d6d6d6
| 355116 ||  || — || October 17, 2006 || Kitt Peak || Spacewatch || EOS || align=right | 2.0 km || 
|-id=117 bgcolor=#d6d6d6
| 355117 ||  || — || October 17, 2006 || Kitt Peak || Spacewatch || — || align=right | 2.6 km || 
|-id=118 bgcolor=#d6d6d6
| 355118 ||  || — || October 18, 2006 || Kitt Peak || Spacewatch || KAR || align=right | 1.1 km || 
|-id=119 bgcolor=#d6d6d6
| 355119 ||  || — || October 18, 2006 || Kitt Peak || Spacewatch || — || align=right | 2.7 km || 
|-id=120 bgcolor=#E9E9E9
| 355120 ||  || — || September 17, 2006 || Catalina || CSS || — || align=right | 2.6 km || 
|-id=121 bgcolor=#d6d6d6
| 355121 ||  || — || October 19, 2006 || Kitt Peak || Spacewatch || — || align=right | 2.1 km || 
|-id=122 bgcolor=#d6d6d6
| 355122 ||  || — || October 19, 2006 || Kitt Peak || Spacewatch || — || align=right | 2.0 km || 
|-id=123 bgcolor=#d6d6d6
| 355123 ||  || — || October 19, 2006 || Kitt Peak || Spacewatch || — || align=right | 2.2 km || 
|-id=124 bgcolor=#d6d6d6
| 355124 ||  || — || October 19, 2006 || Kitt Peak || Spacewatch || — || align=right | 2.7 km || 
|-id=125 bgcolor=#d6d6d6
| 355125 ||  || — || October 19, 2006 || Kitt Peak || Spacewatch || — || align=right | 3.0 km || 
|-id=126 bgcolor=#fefefe
| 355126 ||  || — || October 20, 2006 || Catalina || CSS || H || align=right data-sort-value="0.91" | 910 m || 
|-id=127 bgcolor=#d6d6d6
| 355127 ||  || — || October 21, 2006 || Mount Lemmon || Mount Lemmon Survey || KAR || align=right | 1.2 km || 
|-id=128 bgcolor=#d6d6d6
| 355128 ||  || — || October 16, 2006 || Catalina || CSS || — || align=right | 3.1 km || 
|-id=129 bgcolor=#d6d6d6
| 355129 ||  || — || October 16, 2006 || Catalina || CSS || — || align=right | 4.4 km || 
|-id=130 bgcolor=#E9E9E9
| 355130 ||  || — || October 19, 2006 || Catalina || CSS || — || align=right | 3.0 km || 
|-id=131 bgcolor=#d6d6d6
| 355131 ||  || — || October 19, 2006 || Catalina || CSS || — || align=right | 5.1 km || 
|-id=132 bgcolor=#d6d6d6
| 355132 ||  || — || October 20, 2006 || Kitt Peak || Spacewatch || KOR || align=right | 1.4 km || 
|-id=133 bgcolor=#d6d6d6
| 355133 ||  || — || October 19, 2006 || Catalina || CSS || — || align=right | 3.0 km || 
|-id=134 bgcolor=#fefefe
| 355134 ||  || — || October 23, 2006 || Palomar || NEAT || H || align=right data-sort-value="0.87" | 870 m || 
|-id=135 bgcolor=#E9E9E9
| 355135 ||  || — || October 23, 2006 || Kitt Peak || Spacewatch || MIS || align=right | 3.2 km || 
|-id=136 bgcolor=#d6d6d6
| 355136 ||  || — || October 23, 2006 || Kitt Peak || Spacewatch || EOS || align=right | 2.2 km || 
|-id=137 bgcolor=#d6d6d6
| 355137 ||  || — || September 28, 2006 || Kitt Peak || Spacewatch || — || align=right | 2.6 km || 
|-id=138 bgcolor=#d6d6d6
| 355138 ||  || — || October 17, 2006 || Kitt Peak || Spacewatch || — || align=right | 2.4 km || 
|-id=139 bgcolor=#d6d6d6
| 355139 ||  || — || October 23, 2006 || Kitt Peak || Spacewatch || NAE || align=right | 2.2 km || 
|-id=140 bgcolor=#E9E9E9
| 355140 ||  || — || October 28, 2006 || Mount Lemmon || Mount Lemmon Survey || WIT || align=right | 1.1 km || 
|-id=141 bgcolor=#fefefe
| 355141 ||  || — || October 27, 2006 || Mount Lemmon || Mount Lemmon Survey || H || align=right data-sort-value="0.94" | 940 m || 
|-id=142 bgcolor=#fefefe
| 355142 ||  || — || October 16, 2006 || Socorro || LINEAR || H || align=right data-sort-value="0.93" | 930 m || 
|-id=143 bgcolor=#E9E9E9
| 355143 ||  || — || October 19, 2006 || Kitt Peak || M. W. Buie || — || align=right | 1.8 km || 
|-id=144 bgcolor=#d6d6d6
| 355144 ||  || — || October 16, 2006 || Apache Point || A. C. Becker || — || align=right | 2.5 km || 
|-id=145 bgcolor=#d6d6d6
| 355145 ||  || — || October 26, 2006 || Mauna Kea || P. A. Wiegert || KOR || align=right | 1.4 km || 
|-id=146 bgcolor=#d6d6d6
| 355146 ||  || — || November 9, 2006 || Kitt Peak || Spacewatch || EUP || align=right | 3.9 km || 
|-id=147 bgcolor=#d6d6d6
| 355147 ||  || — || November 11, 2006 || Kitt Peak || Spacewatch || THM || align=right | 2.1 km || 
|-id=148 bgcolor=#d6d6d6
| 355148 ||  || — || November 9, 2006 || Kitt Peak || Spacewatch || — || align=right | 3.3 km || 
|-id=149 bgcolor=#d6d6d6
| 355149 ||  || — || November 10, 2006 || Kitt Peak || Spacewatch || — || align=right | 3.5 km || 
|-id=150 bgcolor=#d6d6d6
| 355150 ||  || — || November 10, 2006 || Kitt Peak || Spacewatch || — || align=right | 3.0 km || 
|-id=151 bgcolor=#d6d6d6
| 355151 ||  || — || November 10, 2006 || Kitt Peak || Spacewatch || URS || align=right | 3.2 km || 
|-id=152 bgcolor=#d6d6d6
| 355152 ||  || — || October 28, 2006 || Kitt Peak || Spacewatch || — || align=right | 2.2 km || 
|-id=153 bgcolor=#d6d6d6
| 355153 ||  || — || November 13, 2006 || Kitt Peak || Spacewatch || — || align=right | 2.6 km || 
|-id=154 bgcolor=#d6d6d6
| 355154 ||  || — || October 17, 2006 || Mount Lemmon || Mount Lemmon Survey || EOS || align=right | 1.9 km || 
|-id=155 bgcolor=#d6d6d6
| 355155 ||  || — || November 11, 2006 || Kitt Peak || Spacewatch || — || align=right | 4.2 km || 
|-id=156 bgcolor=#d6d6d6
| 355156 ||  || — || November 11, 2006 || Kitt Peak || Spacewatch || KOR || align=right | 1.5 km || 
|-id=157 bgcolor=#d6d6d6
| 355157 ||  || — || November 12, 2006 || Mount Lemmon || Mount Lemmon Survey || KOR || align=right | 1.3 km || 
|-id=158 bgcolor=#d6d6d6
| 355158 ||  || — || November 12, 2006 || Mount Lemmon || Mount Lemmon Survey || — || align=right | 2.1 km || 
|-id=159 bgcolor=#d6d6d6
| 355159 ||  || — || November 12, 2006 || Mount Lemmon || Mount Lemmon Survey || — || align=right | 2.5 km || 
|-id=160 bgcolor=#d6d6d6
| 355160 ||  || — || November 11, 2006 || Kitt Peak || Spacewatch || — || align=right | 2.6 km || 
|-id=161 bgcolor=#d6d6d6
| 355161 ||  || — || November 11, 2006 || Kitt Peak || Spacewatch || — || align=right | 3.0 km || 
|-id=162 bgcolor=#d6d6d6
| 355162 ||  || — || November 12, 2006 || Mount Lemmon || Mount Lemmon Survey || EOS || align=right | 2.2 km || 
|-id=163 bgcolor=#d6d6d6
| 355163 ||  || — || November 13, 2006 || Kitt Peak || Spacewatch || — || align=right | 3.5 km || 
|-id=164 bgcolor=#d6d6d6
| 355164 ||  || — || November 15, 2006 || Kitt Peak || Spacewatch || THM || align=right | 1.8 km || 
|-id=165 bgcolor=#d6d6d6
| 355165 ||  || — || November 11, 2006 || Mount Lemmon || Mount Lemmon Survey || — || align=right | 2.4 km || 
|-id=166 bgcolor=#d6d6d6
| 355166 ||  || — || November 11, 2006 || Kitt Peak || Spacewatch || THM || align=right | 2.1 km || 
|-id=167 bgcolor=#d6d6d6
| 355167 ||  || — || November 10, 2006 || Kitt Peak || Spacewatch || EOS || align=right | 2.4 km || 
|-id=168 bgcolor=#d6d6d6
| 355168 ||  || — || November 19, 2006 || Kitt Peak || Spacewatch || — || align=right | 3.1 km || 
|-id=169 bgcolor=#d6d6d6
| 355169 ||  || — || November 16, 2006 || Kitt Peak || Spacewatch || — || align=right | 2.7 km || 
|-id=170 bgcolor=#d6d6d6
| 355170 ||  || — || November 16, 2006 || Socorro || LINEAR || TIR || align=right | 3.0 km || 
|-id=171 bgcolor=#d6d6d6
| 355171 ||  || — || November 16, 2006 || Socorro || LINEAR || — || align=right | 3.4 km || 
|-id=172 bgcolor=#d6d6d6
| 355172 ||  || — || November 16, 2006 || Mount Lemmon || Mount Lemmon Survey || — || align=right | 4.1 km || 
|-id=173 bgcolor=#E9E9E9
| 355173 ||  || — || November 17, 2006 || Mount Lemmon || Mount Lemmon Survey || AGN || align=right | 1.2 km || 
|-id=174 bgcolor=#d6d6d6
| 355174 ||  || — || November 17, 2006 || Mount Lemmon || Mount Lemmon Survey || CHA || align=right | 2.5 km || 
|-id=175 bgcolor=#d6d6d6
| 355175 ||  || — || November 16, 2006 || Kitt Peak || Spacewatch || — || align=right | 2.8 km || 
|-id=176 bgcolor=#d6d6d6
| 355176 ||  || — || November 16, 2006 || Mount Lemmon || Mount Lemmon Survey || — || align=right | 2.9 km || 
|-id=177 bgcolor=#d6d6d6
| 355177 ||  || — || November 16, 2006 || Socorro || LINEAR || — || align=right | 4.0 km || 
|-id=178 bgcolor=#d6d6d6
| 355178 ||  || — || November 16, 2006 || Kitt Peak || Spacewatch || — || align=right | 4.3 km || 
|-id=179 bgcolor=#d6d6d6
| 355179 ||  || — || November 18, 2006 || Kitt Peak || Spacewatch || — || align=right | 2.1 km || 
|-id=180 bgcolor=#d6d6d6
| 355180 ||  || — || November 18, 2006 || Kitt Peak || Spacewatch || THM || align=right | 2.1 km || 
|-id=181 bgcolor=#d6d6d6
| 355181 ||  || — || November 18, 2006 || Socorro || LINEAR || — || align=right | 4.5 km || 
|-id=182 bgcolor=#d6d6d6
| 355182 ||  || — || November 19, 2006 || Kitt Peak || Spacewatch || — || align=right | 2.7 km || 
|-id=183 bgcolor=#d6d6d6
| 355183 ||  || — || November 19, 2006 || Kitt Peak || Spacewatch || — || align=right | 2.1 km || 
|-id=184 bgcolor=#d6d6d6
| 355184 ||  || — || November 11, 2006 || Kitt Peak || Spacewatch || — || align=right | 2.4 km || 
|-id=185 bgcolor=#d6d6d6
| 355185 ||  || — || November 19, 2006 || Kitt Peak || Spacewatch || EOS || align=right | 1.8 km || 
|-id=186 bgcolor=#d6d6d6
| 355186 ||  || — || November 20, 2006 || Mount Lemmon || Mount Lemmon Survey || — || align=right | 2.8 km || 
|-id=187 bgcolor=#d6d6d6
| 355187 ||  || — || November 19, 2006 || Catalina || CSS || — || align=right | 3.5 km || 
|-id=188 bgcolor=#d6d6d6
| 355188 ||  || — || November 22, 2006 || Socorro || LINEAR || LIX || align=right | 3.6 km || 
|-id=189 bgcolor=#d6d6d6
| 355189 ||  || — || November 22, 2006 || Kitt Peak || Spacewatch || — || align=right | 3.6 km || 
|-id=190 bgcolor=#d6d6d6
| 355190 ||  || — || November 24, 2006 || Mount Lemmon || Mount Lemmon Survey || — || align=right | 2.2 km || 
|-id=191 bgcolor=#d6d6d6
| 355191 ||  || — || November 24, 2006 || Kitt Peak || Spacewatch || EOS || align=right | 1.9 km || 
|-id=192 bgcolor=#d6d6d6
| 355192 ||  || — || November 25, 2006 || Kitt Peak || Spacewatch || THM || align=right | 2.1 km || 
|-id=193 bgcolor=#d6d6d6
| 355193 ||  || — || November 17, 2006 || Mount Lemmon || Mount Lemmon Survey || — || align=right | 3.4 km || 
|-id=194 bgcolor=#d6d6d6
| 355194 ||  || — || November 27, 2006 || Mount Lemmon || Mount Lemmon Survey || — || align=right | 5.1 km || 
|-id=195 bgcolor=#d6d6d6
| 355195 ||  || — || December 7, 2006 || Palomar || NEAT || — || align=right | 4.2 km || 
|-id=196 bgcolor=#d6d6d6
| 355196 ||  || — || December 9, 2006 || Palomar || NEAT || — || align=right | 2.8 km || 
|-id=197 bgcolor=#d6d6d6
| 355197 ||  || — || December 10, 2006 || Kitt Peak || Spacewatch || EOS || align=right | 2.3 km || 
|-id=198 bgcolor=#d6d6d6
| 355198 ||  || — || December 12, 2006 || Mount Lemmon || Mount Lemmon Survey || HYG || align=right | 2.4 km || 
|-id=199 bgcolor=#d6d6d6
| 355199 ||  || — || December 13, 2006 || Kitt Peak || Spacewatch || — || align=right | 3.2 km || 
|-id=200 bgcolor=#d6d6d6
| 355200 ||  || — || December 11, 2006 || Kitt Peak || Spacewatch || THM || align=right | 2.3 km || 
|}

355201–355300 

|-bgcolor=#d6d6d6
| 355201 ||  || — || December 13, 2006 || Kitt Peak || Spacewatch || THM || align=right | 2.1 km || 
|-id=202 bgcolor=#d6d6d6
| 355202 ||  || — || November 18, 2006 || Kitt Peak || Spacewatch || — || align=right | 3.8 km || 
|-id=203 bgcolor=#d6d6d6
| 355203 ||  || — || November 16, 2006 || Lulin || Lulin Obs. || — || align=right | 3.8 km || 
|-id=204 bgcolor=#d6d6d6
| 355204 ||  || — || December 11, 2006 || Kitt Peak || Spacewatch || EOS || align=right | 2.4 km || 
|-id=205 bgcolor=#d6d6d6
| 355205 ||  || — || December 15, 2006 || Kitt Peak || Spacewatch || EOS || align=right | 2.6 km || 
|-id=206 bgcolor=#d6d6d6
| 355206 ||  || — || December 20, 2006 || Mount Lemmon || Mount Lemmon Survey || — || align=right | 3.9 km || 
|-id=207 bgcolor=#d6d6d6
| 355207 ||  || — || December 5, 2006 || Palomar || NEAT || THB || align=right | 3.3 km || 
|-id=208 bgcolor=#d6d6d6
| 355208 ||  || — || December 24, 2006 || Kitt Peak || Spacewatch || — || align=right | 5.3 km || 
|-id=209 bgcolor=#d6d6d6
| 355209 ||  || — || December 20, 2006 || Mount Lemmon || Mount Lemmon Survey || THB || align=right | 2.8 km || 
|-id=210 bgcolor=#d6d6d6
| 355210 ||  || — || December 21, 2006 || Kitt Peak || Spacewatch || — || align=right | 4.0 km || 
|-id=211 bgcolor=#d6d6d6
| 355211 ||  || — || December 21, 2006 || Kitt Peak || Spacewatch || — || align=right | 3.5 km || 
|-id=212 bgcolor=#d6d6d6
| 355212 ||  || — || December 21, 2006 || Kitt Peak || Spacewatch || — || align=right | 3.5 km || 
|-id=213 bgcolor=#d6d6d6
| 355213 ||  || — || December 24, 2006 || Kitt Peak || Spacewatch || — || align=right | 4.0 km || 
|-id=214 bgcolor=#d6d6d6
| 355214 ||  || — || December 24, 2006 || Kitt Peak || Spacewatch || — || align=right | 4.1 km || 
|-id=215 bgcolor=#d6d6d6
| 355215 ||  || — || December 27, 2006 || Mount Lemmon || Mount Lemmon Survey || — || align=right | 3.8 km || 
|-id=216 bgcolor=#d6d6d6
| 355216 ||  || — || December 21, 2006 || Mount Lemmon || Mount Lemmon Survey || — || align=right | 2.8 km || 
|-id=217 bgcolor=#d6d6d6
| 355217 ||  || — || December 27, 2006 || Mount Lemmon || Mount Lemmon Survey || HYG || align=right | 2.9 km || 
|-id=218 bgcolor=#d6d6d6
| 355218 ||  || — || January 8, 2007 || Mount Lemmon || Mount Lemmon Survey || — || align=right | 5.0 km || 
|-id=219 bgcolor=#d6d6d6
| 355219 ||  || — || December 24, 2006 || Kitt Peak || Spacewatch || HYG || align=right | 3.2 km || 
|-id=220 bgcolor=#d6d6d6
| 355220 ||  || — || January 10, 2007 || Mount Lemmon || Mount Lemmon Survey || — || align=right | 6.2 km || 
|-id=221 bgcolor=#d6d6d6
| 355221 ||  || — || January 8, 2007 || Mount Lemmon || Mount Lemmon Survey || — || align=right | 2.9 km || 
|-id=222 bgcolor=#d6d6d6
| 355222 ||  || — || January 16, 2007 || Anderson Mesa || LONEOS || EUP || align=right | 5.3 km || 
|-id=223 bgcolor=#d6d6d6
| 355223 ||  || — || January 17, 2007 || Palomar || NEAT || ALA || align=right | 4.0 km || 
|-id=224 bgcolor=#d6d6d6
| 355224 ||  || — || January 17, 2007 || Palomar || NEAT || — || align=right | 4.9 km || 
|-id=225 bgcolor=#d6d6d6
| 355225 ||  || — || January 17, 2007 || Kitt Peak || Spacewatch || — || align=right | 3.3 km || 
|-id=226 bgcolor=#d6d6d6
| 355226 ||  || — || January 24, 2007 || Mount Lemmon || Mount Lemmon Survey || — || align=right | 5.7 km || 
|-id=227 bgcolor=#d6d6d6
| 355227 ||  || — || November 28, 2006 || Mount Lemmon || Mount Lemmon Survey || URS || align=right | 3.5 km || 
|-id=228 bgcolor=#d6d6d6
| 355228 ||  || — || January 26, 2007 || Kitt Peak || Spacewatch || — || align=right | 4.3 km || 
|-id=229 bgcolor=#d6d6d6
| 355229 ||  || — || January 27, 2007 || Mount Lemmon || Mount Lemmon Survey || EOS || align=right | 2.5 km || 
|-id=230 bgcolor=#d6d6d6
| 355230 ||  || — || January 27, 2007 || Mount Lemmon || Mount Lemmon Survey || — || align=right | 3.1 km || 
|-id=231 bgcolor=#d6d6d6
| 355231 ||  || — || January 17, 2007 || Kitt Peak || Spacewatch || — || align=right | 3.8 km || 
|-id=232 bgcolor=#d6d6d6
| 355232 ||  || — || January 17, 2007 || Kitt Peak || Spacewatch || — || align=right | 4.7 km || 
|-id=233 bgcolor=#d6d6d6
| 355233 ||  || — || January 19, 2007 || Mauna Kea || Mauna Kea Obs. || — || align=right | 3.5 km || 
|-id=234 bgcolor=#d6d6d6
| 355234 ||  || — || January 17, 2007 || Kitt Peak || Spacewatch || — || align=right | 3.8 km || 
|-id=235 bgcolor=#d6d6d6
| 355235 ||  || — || February 6, 2007 || Kitt Peak || Spacewatch || — || align=right | 3.0 km || 
|-id=236 bgcolor=#d6d6d6
| 355236 ||  || — || February 6, 2007 || Kitt Peak || Spacewatch || HYG || align=right | 3.2 km || 
|-id=237 bgcolor=#d6d6d6
| 355237 ||  || — || February 6, 2007 || Palomar || NEAT || — || align=right | 2.3 km || 
|-id=238 bgcolor=#d6d6d6
| 355238 ||  || — || February 6, 2007 || Mount Lemmon || Mount Lemmon Survey || — || align=right | 3.5 km || 
|-id=239 bgcolor=#d6d6d6
| 355239 ||  || — || February 10, 2007 || Mount Lemmon || Mount Lemmon Survey || VER || align=right | 2.6 km || 
|-id=240 bgcolor=#d6d6d6
| 355240 ||  || — || February 16, 2007 || Mount Lemmon || Mount Lemmon Survey || — || align=right | 2.9 km || 
|-id=241 bgcolor=#d6d6d6
| 355241 ||  || — || February 16, 2007 || Catalina || CSS || LUT || align=right | 6.1 km || 
|-id=242 bgcolor=#d6d6d6
| 355242 ||  || — || February 17, 2007 || Kitt Peak || Spacewatch || SYL7:4 || align=right | 5.4 km || 
|-id=243 bgcolor=#d6d6d6
| 355243 ||  || — || February 20, 2007 || Lulin Observatory || LUSS || — || align=right | 4.1 km || 
|-id=244 bgcolor=#d6d6d6
| 355244 ||  || — || February 21, 2007 || Kitt Peak || Spacewatch || — || align=right | 4.9 km || 
|-id=245 bgcolor=#d6d6d6
| 355245 ||  || — || May 4, 2002 || Palomar || NEAT || HYG || align=right | 3.2 km || 
|-id=246 bgcolor=#fefefe
| 355246 ||  || — || March 13, 2007 || Kitt Peak || Spacewatch || — || align=right data-sort-value="0.64" | 640 m || 
|-id=247 bgcolor=#d6d6d6
| 355247 ||  || — || March 14, 2007 || Mount Lemmon || Mount Lemmon Survey || — || align=right | 4.0 km || 
|-id=248 bgcolor=#fefefe
| 355248 ||  || — || April 14, 2007 || Kitt Peak || Spacewatch || — || align=right data-sort-value="0.77" | 770 m || 
|-id=249 bgcolor=#fefefe
| 355249 ||  || — || April 15, 2007 || Kitt Peak || Spacewatch || — || align=right data-sort-value="0.61" | 610 m || 
|-id=250 bgcolor=#fefefe
| 355250 ||  || — || April 18, 2007 || Kitt Peak || Spacewatch || — || align=right data-sort-value="0.64" | 640 m || 
|-id=251 bgcolor=#fefefe
| 355251 ||  || — || April 20, 2007 || Kitt Peak || Spacewatch || FLO || align=right data-sort-value="0.49" | 490 m || 
|-id=252 bgcolor=#fefefe
| 355252 ||  || — || April 22, 2007 || Kitt Peak || Spacewatch || — || align=right data-sort-value="0.62" | 620 m || 
|-id=253 bgcolor=#fefefe
| 355253 ||  || — || April 24, 2007 || Kitt Peak || Spacewatch || — || align=right data-sort-value="0.84" | 840 m || 
|-id=254 bgcolor=#fefefe
| 355254 ||  || — || May 9, 2007 || Kitt Peak || Spacewatch || FLO || align=right data-sort-value="0.52" | 520 m || 
|-id=255 bgcolor=#fefefe
| 355255 ||  || — || May 10, 2007 || Mount Lemmon || Mount Lemmon Survey || ERI || align=right | 1.8 km || 
|-id=256 bgcolor=#FFC2E0
| 355256 ||  || — || May 20, 2007 || Catalina || CSS || AMO +1km || align=right | 1.5 km || 
|-id=257 bgcolor=#fefefe
| 355257 ||  || — || May 25, 2007 || Mount Lemmon || Mount Lemmon Survey || — || align=right data-sort-value="0.94" | 940 m || 
|-id=258 bgcolor=#fefefe
| 355258 ||  || — || June 8, 2007 || Kitt Peak || Spacewatch || — || align=right data-sort-value="0.51" | 510 m || 
|-id=259 bgcolor=#fefefe
| 355259 ||  || — || July 14, 2007 || Dauban || Chante-Perdrix Obs. || — || align=right | 1.0 km || 
|-id=260 bgcolor=#fefefe
| 355260 ||  || — || July 17, 2007 || Dauban || Chante-Perdrix Obs. || FLO || align=right data-sort-value="0.85" | 850 m || 
|-id=261 bgcolor=#fefefe
| 355261 ||  || — || January 28, 2006 || Kitt Peak || Spacewatch || V || align=right data-sort-value="0.83" | 830 m || 
|-id=262 bgcolor=#fefefe
| 355262 ||  || — || July 24, 2007 || Reedy Creek || J. Broughton || — || align=right data-sort-value="0.99" | 990 m || 
|-id=263 bgcolor=#fefefe
| 355263 ||  || — || August 4, 2007 || Siding Spring || SSS || — || align=right | 4.0 km || 
|-id=264 bgcolor=#fefefe
| 355264 ||  || — || August 8, 2007 || Socorro || LINEAR || — || align=right | 1.1 km || 
|-id=265 bgcolor=#fefefe
| 355265 ||  || — || August 8, 2007 || Socorro || LINEAR || — || align=right | 1.00 km || 
|-id=266 bgcolor=#fefefe
| 355266 ||  || — || August 9, 2007 || Socorro || LINEAR || V || align=right data-sort-value="0.94" | 940 m || 
|-id=267 bgcolor=#fefefe
| 355267 ||  || — || August 12, 2007 || Socorro || LINEAR || ERI || align=right | 2.6 km || 
|-id=268 bgcolor=#fefefe
| 355268 ||  || — || August 13, 2007 || Socorro || LINEAR || — || align=right | 1.0 km || 
|-id=269 bgcolor=#C2FFFF
| 355269 ||  || — || August 10, 2007 || Kitt Peak || Spacewatch || L4 || align=right | 13 km || 
|-id=270 bgcolor=#C2FFFF
| 355270 ||  || — || August 10, 2007 || Kitt Peak || Spacewatch || L4 || align=right | 12 km || 
|-id=271 bgcolor=#fefefe
| 355271 ||  || — || August 11, 2007 || Socorro || LINEAR || V || align=right data-sort-value="0.87" | 870 m || 
|-id=272 bgcolor=#fefefe
| 355272 ||  || — || August 22, 2007 || Socorro || LINEAR || — || align=right | 1.2 km || 
|-id=273 bgcolor=#E9E9E9
| 355273 ||  || — || August 16, 2007 || Socorro || LINEAR || — || align=right | 1.0 km || 
|-id=274 bgcolor=#fefefe
| 355274 ||  || — || August 24, 2007 || Kitt Peak || Spacewatch || — || align=right data-sort-value="0.88" | 880 m || 
|-id=275 bgcolor=#fefefe
| 355275 ||  || — || September 3, 2007 || Catalina || CSS || — || align=right data-sort-value="0.72" | 720 m || 
|-id=276 bgcolor=#fefefe
| 355276 Leclair ||  ||  || September 12, 2007 || Saint-Sulpice || B. Christophe || — || align=right data-sort-value="0.85" | 850 m || 
|-id=277 bgcolor=#E9E9E9
| 355277 ||  || — || September 12, 2007 || Dauban || Chante-Perdrix Obs. || — || align=right | 1.1 km || 
|-id=278 bgcolor=#E9E9E9
| 355278 ||  || — || September 5, 2007 || Catalina || CSS || — || align=right | 2.2 km || 
|-id=279 bgcolor=#E9E9E9
| 355279 ||  || — || September 5, 2007 || Catalina || CSS || — || align=right | 2.7 km || 
|-id=280 bgcolor=#fefefe
| 355280 ||  || — || September 3, 2007 || Catalina || CSS || NYS || align=right data-sort-value="0.91" | 910 m || 
|-id=281 bgcolor=#fefefe
| 355281 ||  || — || September 9, 2007 || Kitt Peak || Spacewatch || — || align=right | 1.1 km || 
|-id=282 bgcolor=#fefefe
| 355282 ||  || — || September 10, 2007 || Kitt Peak || Spacewatch || — || align=right | 1.0 km || 
|-id=283 bgcolor=#fefefe
| 355283 ||  || — || September 10, 2007 || Mount Lemmon || Mount Lemmon Survey || FLO || align=right data-sort-value="0.73" | 730 m || 
|-id=284 bgcolor=#E9E9E9
| 355284 ||  || — || August 23, 2007 || Kitt Peak || Spacewatch || EUN || align=right | 1.3 km || 
|-id=285 bgcolor=#fefefe
| 355285 ||  || — || September 10, 2007 || Mount Lemmon || Mount Lemmon Survey || V || align=right data-sort-value="0.82" | 820 m || 
|-id=286 bgcolor=#C2FFFF
| 355286 ||  || — || September 11, 2007 || Kitt Peak || Spacewatch || L4 || align=right | 8.7 km || 
|-id=287 bgcolor=#C2FFFF
| 355287 ||  || — || August 10, 2007 || Kitt Peak || Spacewatch || L4ERY || align=right | 7.1 km || 
|-id=288 bgcolor=#fefefe
| 355288 ||  || — || September 13, 2007 || Socorro || LINEAR || NYS || align=right data-sort-value="0.81" | 810 m || 
|-id=289 bgcolor=#E9E9E9
| 355289 ||  || — || September 14, 2007 || Socorro || LINEAR || — || align=right | 1.8 km || 
|-id=290 bgcolor=#fefefe
| 355290 ||  || — || September 10, 2007 || Kitt Peak || Spacewatch || — || align=right data-sort-value="0.78" | 780 m || 
|-id=291 bgcolor=#C2FFFF
| 355291 ||  || — || September 10, 2007 || Kitt Peak || Spacewatch || L4 || align=right | 9.3 km || 
|-id=292 bgcolor=#E9E9E9
| 355292 ||  || — || September 28, 2003 || Anderson Mesa || LONEOS || — || align=right | 1.2 km || 
|-id=293 bgcolor=#E9E9E9
| 355293 ||  || — || September 12, 2007 || Mount Lemmon || Mount Lemmon Survey || — || align=right | 1.2 km || 
|-id=294 bgcolor=#fefefe
| 355294 ||  || — || September 13, 2007 || Mount Lemmon || Mount Lemmon Survey || — || align=right data-sort-value="0.81" | 810 m || 
|-id=295 bgcolor=#E9E9E9
| 355295 ||  || — || September 10, 2007 || Kitt Peak || Spacewatch || — || align=right data-sort-value="0.88" | 880 m || 
|-id=296 bgcolor=#E9E9E9
| 355296 ||  || — || September 10, 2007 || Mount Lemmon || Mount Lemmon Survey || — || align=right | 2.3 km || 
|-id=297 bgcolor=#fefefe
| 355297 ||  || — || September 13, 2007 || Mount Lemmon || Mount Lemmon Survey || NYS || align=right data-sort-value="0.66" | 660 m || 
|-id=298 bgcolor=#E9E9E9
| 355298 ||  || — || September 12, 2007 || Kitt Peak || Spacewatch || — || align=right | 1.2 km || 
|-id=299 bgcolor=#E9E9E9
| 355299 ||  || — || September 13, 2007 || Kitt Peak || Spacewatch || — || align=right | 1.1 km || 
|-id=300 bgcolor=#E9E9E9
| 355300 ||  || — || September 13, 2007 || Kitt Peak || Spacewatch || — || align=right | 1.1 km || 
|}

355301–355400 

|-bgcolor=#fefefe
| 355301 ||  || — || September 3, 2007 || Catalina || CSS || V || align=right data-sort-value="0.75" | 750 m || 
|-id=302 bgcolor=#E9E9E9
| 355302 ||  || — || September 13, 2007 || Socorro || LINEAR || BRU || align=right | 4.0 km || 
|-id=303 bgcolor=#fefefe
| 355303 ||  || — || September 11, 2007 || Kitt Peak || Spacewatch || — || align=right | 1.6 km || 
|-id=304 bgcolor=#E9E9E9
| 355304 ||  || — || September 13, 2007 || Kitt Peak || Spacewatch || — || align=right data-sort-value="0.87" | 870 m || 
|-id=305 bgcolor=#fefefe
| 355305 ||  || — || September 15, 2007 || Kitt Peak || Spacewatch || — || align=right data-sort-value="0.83" | 830 m || 
|-id=306 bgcolor=#E9E9E9
| 355306 ||  || — || September 5, 2007 || Catalina || CSS || JUN || align=right | 1.1 km || 
|-id=307 bgcolor=#E9E9E9
| 355307 ||  || — || September 13, 2007 || Catalina || CSS || — || align=right | 1.2 km || 
|-id=308 bgcolor=#fefefe
| 355308 ||  || — || September 13, 2007 || Mount Lemmon || Mount Lemmon Survey || — || align=right | 1.1 km || 
|-id=309 bgcolor=#E9E9E9
| 355309 ||  || — || September 3, 2007 || Catalina || CSS || — || align=right | 1.1 km || 
|-id=310 bgcolor=#C2FFFF
| 355310 ||  || — || September 10, 2007 || Mount Lemmon || Mount Lemmon Survey || L4 || align=right | 8.7 km || 
|-id=311 bgcolor=#E9E9E9
| 355311 ||  || — || September 3, 2007 || Catalina || CSS || — || align=right | 1.00 km || 
|-id=312 bgcolor=#E9E9E9
| 355312 ||  || — || September 14, 2007 || Catalina || CSS || — || align=right | 1.8 km || 
|-id=313 bgcolor=#fefefe
| 355313 ||  || — || September 11, 2007 || Purple Mountain || PMO NEO || — || align=right data-sort-value="0.78" | 780 m || 
|-id=314 bgcolor=#fefefe
| 355314 ||  || — || September 14, 2007 || Mount Lemmon || Mount Lemmon Survey || V || align=right data-sort-value="0.78" | 780 m || 
|-id=315 bgcolor=#fefefe
| 355315 ||  || — || July 25, 2003 || Palomar || NEAT || — || align=right | 1.0 km || 
|-id=316 bgcolor=#E9E9E9
| 355316 ||  || — || September 12, 2007 || Mount Lemmon || Mount Lemmon Survey || JUL || align=right | 1.2 km || 
|-id=317 bgcolor=#E9E9E9
| 355317 ||  || — || September 18, 2007 || Anderson Mesa || LONEOS || — || align=right | 1.5 km || 
|-id=318 bgcolor=#E9E9E9
| 355318 ||  || — || September 20, 2007 || Catalina || CSS || — || align=right | 2.6 km || 
|-id=319 bgcolor=#E9E9E9
| 355319 ||  || — || September 30, 2007 || Kitt Peak || Spacewatch || — || align=right data-sort-value="0.96" | 960 m || 
|-id=320 bgcolor=#fefefe
| 355320 ||  || — || September 30, 2007 || Kitt Peak || Spacewatch || — || align=right data-sort-value="0.86" | 860 m || 
|-id=321 bgcolor=#E9E9E9
| 355321 ||  || — || February 10, 2004 || Palomar || NEAT || — || align=right | 2.1 km || 
|-id=322 bgcolor=#fefefe
| 355322 || 2007 TF || — || October 1, 2007 || Gaisberg || R. Gierlinger || — || align=right data-sort-value="0.80" | 800 m || 
|-id=323 bgcolor=#E9E9E9
| 355323 ||  || — || October 7, 2007 || Dauban || Chante-Perdrix Obs. || — || align=right | 1.9 km || 
|-id=324 bgcolor=#E9E9E9
| 355324 ||  || — || October 4, 2007 || Kitt Peak || Spacewatch || — || align=right | 1.2 km || 
|-id=325 bgcolor=#E9E9E9
| 355325 ||  || — || October 4, 2007 || Kitt Peak || Spacewatch || — || align=right data-sort-value="0.72" | 720 m || 
|-id=326 bgcolor=#E9E9E9
| 355326 ||  || — || October 7, 2007 || Mount Lemmon || Mount Lemmon Survey || — || align=right | 1.3 km || 
|-id=327 bgcolor=#E9E9E9
| 355327 ||  || — || October 4, 2007 || Kitt Peak || Spacewatch || — || align=right | 1.1 km || 
|-id=328 bgcolor=#E9E9E9
| 355328 ||  || — || October 4, 2007 || Kitt Peak || Spacewatch || — || align=right | 1.4 km || 
|-id=329 bgcolor=#E9E9E9
| 355329 ||  || — || October 4, 2007 || Kitt Peak || Spacewatch || — || align=right | 1.1 km || 
|-id=330 bgcolor=#E9E9E9
| 355330 ||  || — || October 4, 2007 || Kitt Peak || Spacewatch || MIS || align=right | 2.2 km || 
|-id=331 bgcolor=#E9E9E9
| 355331 ||  || — || October 4, 2007 || Kitt Peak || Spacewatch || — || align=right | 1.3 km || 
|-id=332 bgcolor=#E9E9E9
| 355332 ||  || — || October 4, 2007 || Kitt Peak || Spacewatch || — || align=right | 1.3 km || 
|-id=333 bgcolor=#E9E9E9
| 355333 ||  || — || February 1, 2005 || Kitt Peak || Spacewatch || — || align=right data-sort-value="0.94" | 940 m || 
|-id=334 bgcolor=#E9E9E9
| 355334 ||  || — || October 8, 2007 || Catalina || CSS || — || align=right | 1.3 km || 
|-id=335 bgcolor=#E9E9E9
| 355335 ||  || — || October 14, 2007 || Farra d'Isonzo || Farra d'Isonzo || — || align=right | 1.6 km || 
|-id=336 bgcolor=#E9E9E9
| 355336 ||  || — || October 5, 2007 || Kitt Peak || Spacewatch || — || align=right | 1.3 km || 
|-id=337 bgcolor=#E9E9E9
| 355337 ||  || — || October 8, 2007 || Kitt Peak || Spacewatch || — || align=right | 1.0 km || 
|-id=338 bgcolor=#E9E9E9
| 355338 ||  || — || October 8, 2007 || Catalina || CSS || — || align=right | 1.4 km || 
|-id=339 bgcolor=#E9E9E9
| 355339 ||  || — || October 8, 2007 || Mount Lemmon || Mount Lemmon Survey || — || align=right | 1.4 km || 
|-id=340 bgcolor=#fefefe
| 355340 ||  || — || October 7, 2007 || Mount Lemmon || Mount Lemmon Survey || MAS || align=right data-sort-value="0.81" | 810 m || 
|-id=341 bgcolor=#E9E9E9
| 355341 ||  || — || October 8, 2007 || Catalina || CSS || — || align=right | 1.5 km || 
|-id=342 bgcolor=#E9E9E9
| 355342 ||  || — || October 8, 2007 || Catalina || CSS || JUN || align=right data-sort-value="0.91" | 910 m || 
|-id=343 bgcolor=#E9E9E9
| 355343 ||  || — || October 9, 2007 || Mount Lemmon || Mount Lemmon Survey || — || align=right data-sort-value="0.95" | 950 m || 
|-id=344 bgcolor=#E9E9E9
| 355344 ||  || — || October 6, 2007 || Kitt Peak || Spacewatch || EUN || align=right | 1.2 km || 
|-id=345 bgcolor=#E9E9E9
| 355345 ||  || — || September 13, 2007 || Mount Lemmon || Mount Lemmon Survey || — || align=right | 1.8 km || 
|-id=346 bgcolor=#E9E9E9
| 355346 ||  || — || October 8, 2007 || Mount Lemmon || Mount Lemmon Survey || — || align=right | 1.1 km || 
|-id=347 bgcolor=#E9E9E9
| 355347 ||  || — || September 10, 2007 || Mount Lemmon || Mount Lemmon Survey || EUN || align=right | 1.3 km || 
|-id=348 bgcolor=#E9E9E9
| 355348 ||  || — || October 9, 2007 || Socorro || LINEAR || — || align=right | 1.4 km || 
|-id=349 bgcolor=#E9E9E9
| 355349 ||  || — || October 9, 2007 || Socorro || LINEAR || — || align=right | 1.7 km || 
|-id=350 bgcolor=#E9E9E9
| 355350 ||  || — || October 9, 2007 || Socorro || LINEAR || MAR || align=right | 1.5 km || 
|-id=351 bgcolor=#fefefe
| 355351 ||  || — || October 12, 2007 || Socorro || LINEAR || — || align=right | 1.3 km || 
|-id=352 bgcolor=#E9E9E9
| 355352 ||  || — || January 15, 2004 || Kitt Peak || Spacewatch || AGN || align=right | 1.2 km || 
|-id=353 bgcolor=#E9E9E9
| 355353 ||  || — || October 13, 2007 || Cordell-Lorenz || D. T. Durig || — || align=right | 1.7 km || 
|-id=354 bgcolor=#E9E9E9
| 355354 ||  || — || October 8, 2007 || Kitt Peak || Spacewatch || — || align=right data-sort-value="0.87" | 870 m || 
|-id=355 bgcolor=#fefefe
| 355355 ||  || — || October 8, 2007 || Kitt Peak || Spacewatch || NYS || align=right data-sort-value="0.75" | 750 m || 
|-id=356 bgcolor=#fefefe
| 355356 ||  || — || August 10, 2007 || Kitt Peak || Spacewatch || V || align=right data-sort-value="0.93" | 930 m || 
|-id=357 bgcolor=#E9E9E9
| 355357 ||  || — || October 10, 2007 || Catalina || CSS || EUN || align=right | 1.8 km || 
|-id=358 bgcolor=#E9E9E9
| 355358 ||  || — || October 8, 2007 || Catalina || CSS || ADE || align=right | 1.9 km || 
|-id=359 bgcolor=#E9E9E9
| 355359 ||  || — || October 9, 2007 || Catalina || CSS || JUN || align=right | 1.2 km || 
|-id=360 bgcolor=#fefefe
| 355360 ||  || — || October 8, 2007 || Mount Lemmon || Mount Lemmon Survey || MAS || align=right data-sort-value="0.84" | 840 m || 
|-id=361 bgcolor=#fefefe
| 355361 ||  || — || October 8, 2007 || Mount Lemmon || Mount Lemmon Survey || — || align=right data-sort-value="0.93" | 930 m || 
|-id=362 bgcolor=#E9E9E9
| 355362 ||  || — || October 8, 2007 || Mount Lemmon || Mount Lemmon Survey || — || align=right data-sort-value="0.85" | 850 m || 
|-id=363 bgcolor=#E9E9E9
| 355363 ||  || — || October 10, 2007 || Kitt Peak || Spacewatch || AER || align=right | 1.4 km || 
|-id=364 bgcolor=#E9E9E9
| 355364 ||  || — || September 15, 2007 || Mount Lemmon || Mount Lemmon Survey || MIS || align=right | 2.5 km || 
|-id=365 bgcolor=#fefefe
| 355365 ||  || — || October 12, 2007 || Kitt Peak || Spacewatch || — || align=right data-sort-value="0.95" | 950 m || 
|-id=366 bgcolor=#E9E9E9
| 355366 ||  || — || October 9, 2007 || Kitt Peak || Spacewatch || — || align=right | 2.1 km || 
|-id=367 bgcolor=#fefefe
| 355367 ||  || — || October 11, 2007 || Mount Lemmon || Mount Lemmon Survey || NYS || align=right data-sort-value="0.83" | 830 m || 
|-id=368 bgcolor=#E9E9E9
| 355368 ||  || — || August 21, 2007 || Siding Spring || SSS || — || align=right | 2.1 km || 
|-id=369 bgcolor=#E9E9E9
| 355369 ||  || — || October 11, 2007 || Kitt Peak || Spacewatch || — || align=right | 1.3 km || 
|-id=370 bgcolor=#E9E9E9
| 355370 ||  || — || October 11, 2007 || Mount Lemmon || Mount Lemmon Survey || — || align=right | 1.7 km || 
|-id=371 bgcolor=#E9E9E9
| 355371 ||  || — || October 11, 2007 || Kitt Peak || Spacewatch || EUN || align=right | 1.3 km || 
|-id=372 bgcolor=#E9E9E9
| 355372 ||  || — || October 11, 2007 || Kitt Peak || Spacewatch || — || align=right | 1.2 km || 
|-id=373 bgcolor=#E9E9E9
| 355373 ||  || — || September 12, 2007 || Mount Lemmon || Mount Lemmon Survey || — || align=right | 1.8 km || 
|-id=374 bgcolor=#E9E9E9
| 355374 ||  || — || October 11, 2007 || Kitt Peak || Spacewatch || — || align=right data-sort-value="0.89" | 890 m || 
|-id=375 bgcolor=#C2FFFF
| 355375 ||  || — || October 14, 2007 || Mount Lemmon || Mount Lemmon Survey || L4 || align=right | 11 km || 
|-id=376 bgcolor=#E9E9E9
| 355376 ||  || — || October 9, 2007 || Purple Mountain || PMO NEO || — || align=right | 1.3 km || 
|-id=377 bgcolor=#E9E9E9
| 355377 ||  || — || September 12, 2007 || Catalina || CSS || JUN || align=right | 1.4 km || 
|-id=378 bgcolor=#E9E9E9
| 355378 ||  || — || October 9, 2007 || Kitt Peak || Spacewatch || — || align=right | 1.4 km || 
|-id=379 bgcolor=#E9E9E9
| 355379 ||  || — || October 10, 2007 || Catalina || CSS || — || align=right | 1.4 km || 
|-id=380 bgcolor=#E9E9E9
| 355380 ||  || — || October 15, 2007 || Kitt Peak || Spacewatch || — || align=right | 1.3 km || 
|-id=381 bgcolor=#E9E9E9
| 355381 ||  || — || October 15, 2007 || Mount Lemmon || Mount Lemmon Survey || — || align=right | 1.9 km || 
|-id=382 bgcolor=#E9E9E9
| 355382 ||  || — || October 13, 2007 || Anderson Mesa || LONEOS || MAR || align=right | 1.5 km || 
|-id=383 bgcolor=#E9E9E9
| 355383 ||  || — || September 12, 2007 || Catalina || CSS || BRG || align=right | 1.5 km || 
|-id=384 bgcolor=#E9E9E9
| 355384 ||  || — || October 9, 2007 || Kitt Peak || Spacewatch || — || align=right | 3.0 km || 
|-id=385 bgcolor=#E9E9E9
| 355385 ||  || — || October 6, 2007 || Kitt Peak || Spacewatch || — || align=right | 1.5 km || 
|-id=386 bgcolor=#E9E9E9
| 355386 ||  || — || October 9, 2007 || Kitt Peak || Spacewatch || — || align=right data-sort-value="0.88" | 880 m || 
|-id=387 bgcolor=#C2FFFF
| 355387 ||  || — || October 4, 2007 || Mount Lemmon || Mount Lemmon Survey || L4 || align=right | 9.3 km || 
|-id=388 bgcolor=#E9E9E9
| 355388 ||  || — || October 8, 2007 || Catalina || CSS || — || align=right | 1.4 km || 
|-id=389 bgcolor=#E9E9E9
| 355389 ||  || — || February 9, 2005 || Mount Lemmon || Mount Lemmon Survey || — || align=right data-sort-value="0.84" | 840 m || 
|-id=390 bgcolor=#E9E9E9
| 355390 ||  || — || October 12, 2007 || Mount Lemmon || Mount Lemmon Survey || — || align=right | 1.6 km || 
|-id=391 bgcolor=#E9E9E9
| 355391 ||  || — || October 10, 2007 || Catalina || CSS || EUN || align=right | 1.1 km || 
|-id=392 bgcolor=#E9E9E9
| 355392 ||  || — || October 9, 2007 || Catalina || CSS || — || align=right | 1.3 km || 
|-id=393 bgcolor=#E9E9E9
| 355393 ||  || — || October 14, 2007 || Mount Lemmon || Mount Lemmon Survey || — || align=right | 1.3 km || 
|-id=394 bgcolor=#E9E9E9
| 355394 || 2007 UX || — || October 16, 2007 || 7300 Observatory || W. K. Y. Yeung || — || align=right | 1.9 km || 
|-id=395 bgcolor=#E9E9E9
| 355395 ||  || — || September 13, 2007 || Catalina || CSS || — || align=right | 2.3 km || 
|-id=396 bgcolor=#E9E9E9
| 355396 ||  || — || October 17, 2007 || Anderson Mesa || LONEOS || — || align=right | 1.8 km || 
|-id=397 bgcolor=#E9E9E9
| 355397 ||  || — || October 16, 2007 || Catalina || CSS || KRM || align=right | 2.9 km || 
|-id=398 bgcolor=#fefefe
| 355398 ||  || — || October 18, 2007 || Mount Lemmon || Mount Lemmon Survey || NYS || align=right data-sort-value="0.84" | 840 m || 
|-id=399 bgcolor=#E9E9E9
| 355399 ||  || — || October 17, 2007 || Catalina || CSS || — || align=right | 1.9 km || 
|-id=400 bgcolor=#E9E9E9
| 355400 ||  || — || October 18, 2007 || Kitt Peak || Spacewatch || — || align=right | 1.1 km || 
|}

355401–355500 

|-bgcolor=#E9E9E9
| 355401 ||  || — || October 20, 2007 || Catalina || CSS || — || align=right | 1.7 km || 
|-id=402 bgcolor=#E9E9E9
| 355402 ||  || — || October 24, 2007 || Mount Lemmon || Mount Lemmon Survey || — || align=right | 1.3 km || 
|-id=403 bgcolor=#E9E9E9
| 355403 ||  || — || October 30, 2007 || Kitt Peak || Spacewatch || — || align=right | 1.6 km || 
|-id=404 bgcolor=#E9E9E9
| 355404 ||  || — || October 30, 2007 || Mount Lemmon || Mount Lemmon Survey || — || align=right | 1.4 km || 
|-id=405 bgcolor=#E9E9E9
| 355405 ||  || — || October 30, 2007 || Kitt Peak || Spacewatch || — || align=right data-sort-value="0.90" | 900 m || 
|-id=406 bgcolor=#E9E9E9
| 355406 ||  || — || October 31, 2007 || Mount Lemmon || Mount Lemmon Survey || — || align=right | 1.2 km || 
|-id=407 bgcolor=#fefefe
| 355407 ||  || — || October 10, 2007 || Kitt Peak || Spacewatch || MAS || align=right data-sort-value="0.79" | 790 m || 
|-id=408 bgcolor=#E9E9E9
| 355408 ||  || — || October 30, 2007 || Catalina || CSS || — || align=right data-sort-value="0.92" | 920 m || 
|-id=409 bgcolor=#E9E9E9
| 355409 ||  || — || October 30, 2007 || Kitt Peak || Spacewatch || — || align=right | 2.1 km || 
|-id=410 bgcolor=#fefefe
| 355410 ||  || — || October 30, 2007 || Kitt Peak || Spacewatch || NYS || align=right data-sort-value="0.73" | 730 m || 
|-id=411 bgcolor=#E9E9E9
| 355411 ||  || — || October 10, 2007 || Kitt Peak || Spacewatch || — || align=right | 1.3 km || 
|-id=412 bgcolor=#E9E9E9
| 355412 ||  || — || October 30, 2007 || Kitt Peak || Spacewatch || — || align=right | 1.5 km || 
|-id=413 bgcolor=#E9E9E9
| 355413 ||  || — || October 11, 2007 || Kitt Peak || Spacewatch || — || align=right | 1.5 km || 
|-id=414 bgcolor=#E9E9E9
| 355414 ||  || — || October 31, 2007 || Kitt Peak || Spacewatch || — || align=right | 1.7 km || 
|-id=415 bgcolor=#E9E9E9
| 355415 ||  || — || October 31, 2007 || Kitt Peak || Spacewatch || — || align=right | 1.8 km || 
|-id=416 bgcolor=#E9E9E9
| 355416 ||  || — || October 20, 2007 || Mount Lemmon || Mount Lemmon Survey || — || align=right | 1.2 km || 
|-id=417 bgcolor=#E9E9E9
| 355417 ||  || — || October 30, 2007 || Kitt Peak || Spacewatch || — || align=right | 1.3 km || 
|-id=418 bgcolor=#E9E9E9
| 355418 ||  || — || October 20, 2007 || Catalina || CSS || — || align=right | 1.5 km || 
|-id=419 bgcolor=#E9E9E9
| 355419 ||  || — || October 30, 2007 || Kitt Peak || Spacewatch || — || align=right | 1.0 km || 
|-id=420 bgcolor=#E9E9E9
| 355420 ||  || — || October 30, 2007 || Kitt Peak || Spacewatch || GEF || align=right | 1.3 km || 
|-id=421 bgcolor=#E9E9E9
| 355421 ||  || — || October 17, 2007 || Mount Lemmon || Mount Lemmon Survey || MIS || align=right | 2.9 km || 
|-id=422 bgcolor=#E9E9E9
| 355422 ||  || — || October 20, 2007 || Mount Lemmon || Mount Lemmon Survey || ADE || align=right | 1.9 km || 
|-id=423 bgcolor=#E9E9E9
| 355423 ||  || — || November 2, 2007 || Socorro || LINEAR || — || align=right | 1.4 km || 
|-id=424 bgcolor=#E9E9E9
| 355424 ||  || — || November 3, 2007 || Lumezzane || G. P. Pizzetti, A. Soffiantini || WIT || align=right | 1.1 km || 
|-id=425 bgcolor=#E9E9E9
| 355425 ||  || — || November 2, 2007 || Socorro || LINEAR || — || align=right | 2.1 km || 
|-id=426 bgcolor=#E9E9E9
| 355426 ||  || — || November 3, 2007 || Kitt Peak || Spacewatch || RAF || align=right | 1.3 km || 
|-id=427 bgcolor=#fefefe
| 355427 ||  || — || November 2, 2007 || Mount Lemmon || Mount Lemmon Survey || NYS || align=right data-sort-value="0.79" | 790 m || 
|-id=428 bgcolor=#E9E9E9
| 355428 ||  || — || November 1, 2007 || Kitt Peak || Spacewatch || MAR || align=right | 1.4 km || 
|-id=429 bgcolor=#E9E9E9
| 355429 ||  || — || November 2, 2007 || Catalina || CSS || ADE || align=right | 2.2 km || 
|-id=430 bgcolor=#E9E9E9
| 355430 ||  || — || December 16, 1999 || Kitt Peak || Spacewatch || — || align=right | 1.3 km || 
|-id=431 bgcolor=#d6d6d6
| 355431 ||  || — || November 3, 2007 || Mount Lemmon || Mount Lemmon Survey || 615 || align=right | 1.6 km || 
|-id=432 bgcolor=#E9E9E9
| 355432 ||  || — || November 1, 2007 || Kitt Peak || Spacewatch || — || align=right data-sort-value="0.88" | 880 m || 
|-id=433 bgcolor=#E9E9E9
| 355433 ||  || — || October 20, 2007 || Mount Lemmon || Mount Lemmon Survey || — || align=right | 1.8 km || 
|-id=434 bgcolor=#E9E9E9
| 355434 ||  || — || November 1, 2007 || Kitt Peak || Spacewatch || — || align=right | 2.9 km || 
|-id=435 bgcolor=#E9E9E9
| 355435 ||  || — || November 2, 2007 || Catalina || CSS || JUN || align=right | 1.3 km || 
|-id=436 bgcolor=#E9E9E9
| 355436 ||  || — || November 1, 2007 || Kitt Peak || Spacewatch || AER || align=right | 1.5 km || 
|-id=437 bgcolor=#E9E9E9
| 355437 ||  || — || November 1, 2007 || Kitt Peak || Spacewatch || — || align=right | 1.2 km || 
|-id=438 bgcolor=#E9E9E9
| 355438 ||  || — || November 1, 2007 || Kitt Peak || Spacewatch || — || align=right | 1.3 km || 
|-id=439 bgcolor=#E9E9E9
| 355439 ||  || — || November 2, 2007 || Kitt Peak || Spacewatch || — || align=right | 1.5 km || 
|-id=440 bgcolor=#fefefe
| 355440 ||  || — || November 3, 2007 || Kitt Peak || Spacewatch || NYS || align=right data-sort-value="0.73" | 730 m || 
|-id=441 bgcolor=#E9E9E9
| 355441 ||  || — || November 1, 2007 || Kitt Peak || Spacewatch || — || align=right | 1.7 km || 
|-id=442 bgcolor=#E9E9E9
| 355442 ||  || — || November 3, 2007 || Kitt Peak || Spacewatch || — || align=right | 1.2 km || 
|-id=443 bgcolor=#E9E9E9
| 355443 ||  || — || November 2, 2007 || Socorro || LINEAR || — || align=right | 2.2 km || 
|-id=444 bgcolor=#E9E9E9
| 355444 ||  || — || November 2, 2007 || Kitt Peak || Spacewatch || ADE || align=right | 2.2 km || 
|-id=445 bgcolor=#E9E9E9
| 355445 ||  || — || September 14, 2007 || Mount Lemmon || Mount Lemmon Survey || — || align=right | 1.1 km || 
|-id=446 bgcolor=#E9E9E9
| 355446 ||  || — || November 1, 2007 || Mount Lemmon || Mount Lemmon Survey || — || align=right data-sort-value="0.97" | 970 m || 
|-id=447 bgcolor=#E9E9E9
| 355447 ||  || — || October 8, 2007 || Mount Lemmon || Mount Lemmon Survey || — || align=right data-sort-value="0.89" | 890 m || 
|-id=448 bgcolor=#E9E9E9
| 355448 ||  || — || November 3, 2007 || Mount Lemmon || Mount Lemmon Survey || — || align=right | 2.4 km || 
|-id=449 bgcolor=#E9E9E9
| 355449 ||  || — || November 4, 2007 || Kitt Peak || Spacewatch || MRX || align=right | 1.3 km || 
|-id=450 bgcolor=#fefefe
| 355450 ||  || — || November 4, 2007 || Kitt Peak || Spacewatch || — || align=right data-sort-value="0.94" | 940 m || 
|-id=451 bgcolor=#E9E9E9
| 355451 ||  || — || November 5, 2007 || Kitt Peak || Spacewatch || — || align=right | 1.6 km || 
|-id=452 bgcolor=#E9E9E9
| 355452 ||  || — || November 4, 2007 || Catalina || CSS || INO || align=right | 1.2 km || 
|-id=453 bgcolor=#E9E9E9
| 355453 ||  || — || November 11, 2007 || Catalina || CSS || ADE || align=right | 2.3 km || 
|-id=454 bgcolor=#E9E9E9
| 355454 ||  || — || November 7, 2007 || Kitt Peak || Spacewatch || — || align=right data-sort-value="0.81" | 810 m || 
|-id=455 bgcolor=#E9E9E9
| 355455 ||  || — || November 9, 2007 || Kitt Peak || Spacewatch || — || align=right data-sort-value="0.89" | 890 m || 
|-id=456 bgcolor=#E9E9E9
| 355456 ||  || — || November 12, 2007 || Mount Lemmon || Mount Lemmon Survey || KON || align=right | 2.6 km || 
|-id=457 bgcolor=#E9E9E9
| 355457 ||  || — || November 2, 2007 || Socorro || LINEAR || RAF || align=right | 1.3 km || 
|-id=458 bgcolor=#E9E9E9
| 355458 ||  || — || October 12, 2007 || Mount Lemmon || Mount Lemmon Survey || JUN || align=right data-sort-value="0.94" | 940 m || 
|-id=459 bgcolor=#E9E9E9
| 355459 ||  || — || November 7, 2007 || Kitt Peak || Spacewatch || — || align=right | 1.3 km || 
|-id=460 bgcolor=#E9E9E9
| 355460 ||  || — || November 9, 2007 || Kitt Peak || Spacewatch || — || align=right | 1.2 km || 
|-id=461 bgcolor=#fefefe
| 355461 ||  || — || November 9, 2007 || Kitt Peak || Spacewatch || — || align=right | 1.0 km || 
|-id=462 bgcolor=#E9E9E9
| 355462 ||  || — || November 13, 2007 || Kitt Peak || Spacewatch || — || align=right | 3.0 km || 
|-id=463 bgcolor=#E9E9E9
| 355463 ||  || — || November 11, 2007 || Mount Lemmon || Mount Lemmon Survey || — || align=right | 2.1 km || 
|-id=464 bgcolor=#E9E9E9
| 355464 ||  || — || November 2, 2007 || Kitt Peak || Spacewatch || — || align=right | 1.6 km || 
|-id=465 bgcolor=#E9E9E9
| 355465 ||  || — || September 20, 2007 || Catalina || CSS || JUN || align=right | 1.3 km || 
|-id=466 bgcolor=#E9E9E9
| 355466 ||  || — || November 14, 2007 || Kitt Peak || Spacewatch || — || align=right | 1.4 km || 
|-id=467 bgcolor=#E9E9E9
| 355467 ||  || — || October 19, 2007 || Socorro || LINEAR || — || align=right | 1.7 km || 
|-id=468 bgcolor=#E9E9E9
| 355468 ||  || — || October 12, 2007 || Mount Lemmon || Mount Lemmon Survey || — || align=right | 1.8 km || 
|-id=469 bgcolor=#fefefe
| 355469 ||  || — || November 2, 2007 || Catalina || CSS || — || align=right data-sort-value="0.69" | 690 m || 
|-id=470 bgcolor=#E9E9E9
| 355470 ||  || — || November 3, 2007 || Catalina || CSS || — || align=right | 1.9 km || 
|-id=471 bgcolor=#d6d6d6
| 355471 ||  || — || November 7, 2007 || Mount Lemmon || Mount Lemmon Survey || KOR || align=right | 1.6 km || 
|-id=472 bgcolor=#E9E9E9
| 355472 ||  || — || November 2, 2007 || Kitt Peak || Spacewatch || — || align=right | 1.2 km || 
|-id=473 bgcolor=#E9E9E9
| 355473 ||  || — || November 2, 2007 || Kitt Peak || Spacewatch || — || align=right | 1.9 km || 
|-id=474 bgcolor=#E9E9E9
| 355474 ||  || — || November 9, 2007 || Kitt Peak || Spacewatch || — || align=right | 1.0 km || 
|-id=475 bgcolor=#E9E9E9
| 355475 ||  || — || November 3, 2007 || Mount Lemmon || Mount Lemmon Survey || — || align=right | 2.5 km || 
|-id=476 bgcolor=#fefefe
| 355476 ||  || — || October 2, 2003 || Kitt Peak || Spacewatch || — || align=right | 1.1 km || 
|-id=477 bgcolor=#E9E9E9
| 355477 ||  || — || September 10, 2007 || Mount Lemmon || Mount Lemmon Survey || — || align=right data-sort-value="0.97" | 970 m || 
|-id=478 bgcolor=#E9E9E9
| 355478 ||  || — || November 29, 2003 || Kitt Peak || Spacewatch || — || align=right | 1.7 km || 
|-id=479 bgcolor=#d6d6d6
| 355479 ||  || — || November 7, 2007 || Kitt Peak || Spacewatch || NAE || align=right | 2.5 km || 
|-id=480 bgcolor=#d6d6d6
| 355480 ||  || — || November 7, 2007 || Mount Lemmon || Mount Lemmon Survey || — || align=right | 3.6 km || 
|-id=481 bgcolor=#E9E9E9
| 355481 ||  || — || November 14, 2007 || Kitt Peak || Spacewatch || — || align=right | 2.4 km || 
|-id=482 bgcolor=#E9E9E9
| 355482 ||  || — || November 17, 2007 || Socorro || LINEAR || — || align=right | 2.4 km || 
|-id=483 bgcolor=#E9E9E9
| 355483 ||  || — || August 13, 2002 || Palomar || NEAT || — || align=right | 2.0 km || 
|-id=484 bgcolor=#E9E9E9
| 355484 ||  || — || November 18, 2007 || Mount Lemmon || Mount Lemmon Survey || — || align=right | 2.6 km || 
|-id=485 bgcolor=#E9E9E9
| 355485 ||  || — || November 7, 2007 || Kitt Peak || Spacewatch || — || align=right | 1.7 km || 
|-id=486 bgcolor=#E9E9E9
| 355486 ||  || — || November 4, 2007 || Kitt Peak || Spacewatch || — || align=right | 2.0 km || 
|-id=487 bgcolor=#E9E9E9
| 355487 ||  || — || November 18, 2007 || Catalina || CSS || — || align=right | 1.8 km || 
|-id=488 bgcolor=#E9E9E9
| 355488 ||  || — || November 21, 2007 || Mount Lemmon || Mount Lemmon Survey || — || align=right | 2.8 km || 
|-id=489 bgcolor=#E9E9E9
| 355489 ||  || — || November 17, 2007 || Socorro || LINEAR || — || align=right | 2.0 km || 
|-id=490 bgcolor=#E9E9E9
| 355490 ||  || — || November 19, 2007 || Kitt Peak || Spacewatch || — || align=right | 1.5 km || 
|-id=491 bgcolor=#E9E9E9
| 355491 ||  || — || December 3, 2007 || Kitt Peak || Spacewatch || AGN || align=right | 1.3 km || 
|-id=492 bgcolor=#E9E9E9
| 355492 ||  || — || October 13, 2007 || Socorro || LINEAR || — || align=right | 2.9 km || 
|-id=493 bgcolor=#E9E9E9
| 355493 ||  || — || December 5, 2007 || Bisei SG Center || BATTeRS || — || align=right | 2.5 km || 
|-id=494 bgcolor=#E9E9E9
| 355494 ||  || — || November 8, 2007 || Socorro || LINEAR || — || align=right | 2.7 km || 
|-id=495 bgcolor=#E9E9E9
| 355495 ||  || — || December 12, 2007 || La Sagra || OAM Obs. || XIZ || align=right | 1.3 km || 
|-id=496 bgcolor=#E9E9E9
| 355496 ||  || — || January 27, 2004 || Anderson Mesa || LONEOS || — || align=right | 3.1 km || 
|-id=497 bgcolor=#E9E9E9
| 355497 ||  || — || December 15, 2007 || Kanab || E. E. Sheridan || — || align=right | 2.2 km || 
|-id=498 bgcolor=#E9E9E9
| 355498 ||  || — || December 13, 2007 || Socorro || LINEAR || — || align=right | 2.3 km || 
|-id=499 bgcolor=#E9E9E9
| 355499 ||  || — || November 12, 2007 || Mount Lemmon || Mount Lemmon Survey || HNA || align=right | 3.0 km || 
|-id=500 bgcolor=#E9E9E9
| 355500 ||  || — || December 15, 2007 || Socorro || LINEAR || MAR || align=right | 1.7 km || 
|}

355501–355600 

|-bgcolor=#E9E9E9
| 355501 ||  || — || December 18, 2007 || Bergisch Gladbach || W. Bickel || HOF || align=right | 3.1 km || 
|-id=502 bgcolor=#E9E9E9
| 355502 ||  || — || December 16, 2007 || Mount Lemmon || Mount Lemmon Survey || WIT || align=right | 1.1 km || 
|-id=503 bgcolor=#E9E9E9
| 355503 ||  || — || December 16, 2007 || Mount Lemmon || Mount Lemmon Survey || — || align=right | 3.1 km || 
|-id=504 bgcolor=#d6d6d6
| 355504 ||  || — || December 18, 2007 || Kitt Peak || Spacewatch || — || align=right | 3.1 km || 
|-id=505 bgcolor=#d6d6d6
| 355505 ||  || — || December 30, 2007 || Mount Lemmon || Mount Lemmon Survey || — || align=right | 3.0 km || 
|-id=506 bgcolor=#d6d6d6
| 355506 ||  || — || December 30, 2007 || Mount Lemmon || Mount Lemmon Survey || — || align=right | 3.6 km || 
|-id=507 bgcolor=#E9E9E9
| 355507 ||  || — || December 28, 2007 || Kitt Peak || Spacewatch || — || align=right | 2.9 km || 
|-id=508 bgcolor=#E9E9E9
| 355508 ||  || — || December 28, 2007 || Kitt Peak || Spacewatch || AGN || align=right | 1.3 km || 
|-id=509 bgcolor=#E9E9E9
| 355509 ||  || — || December 30, 2007 || Kitt Peak || Spacewatch || — || align=right | 2.3 km || 
|-id=510 bgcolor=#E9E9E9
| 355510 ||  || — || December 28, 2007 || Kitt Peak || Spacewatch || — || align=right | 2.3 km || 
|-id=511 bgcolor=#d6d6d6
| 355511 ||  || — || December 30, 2007 || Mount Lemmon || Mount Lemmon Survey || — || align=right | 2.1 km || 
|-id=512 bgcolor=#d6d6d6
| 355512 ||  || — || December 31, 2007 || Kitt Peak || Spacewatch || — || align=right | 2.2 km || 
|-id=513 bgcolor=#d6d6d6
| 355513 ||  || — || December 31, 2007 || Mount Lemmon || Mount Lemmon Survey || NAE || align=right | 2.2 km || 
|-id=514 bgcolor=#E9E9E9
| 355514 ||  || — || December 30, 2007 || Mount Lemmon || Mount Lemmon Survey || — || align=right | 2.3 km || 
|-id=515 bgcolor=#E9E9E9
| 355515 ||  || — || December 16, 2007 || Mount Lemmon || Mount Lemmon Survey || WIT || align=right | 1.2 km || 
|-id=516 bgcolor=#d6d6d6
| 355516 ||  || — || January 10, 2008 || Mount Lemmon || Mount Lemmon Survey || — || align=right | 1.9 km || 
|-id=517 bgcolor=#d6d6d6
| 355517 ||  || — || January 10, 2008 || Mount Lemmon || Mount Lemmon Survey || — || align=right | 2.4 km || 
|-id=518 bgcolor=#d6d6d6
| 355518 ||  || — || January 10, 2008 || Mount Lemmon || Mount Lemmon Survey || — || align=right | 3.3 km || 
|-id=519 bgcolor=#E9E9E9
| 355519 ||  || — || January 10, 2008 || Mount Lemmon || Mount Lemmon Survey || WIT || align=right data-sort-value="0.96" | 960 m || 
|-id=520 bgcolor=#E9E9E9
| 355520 ||  || — || November 13, 2007 || Kitt Peak || Spacewatch || HEN || align=right data-sort-value="0.98" | 980 m || 
|-id=521 bgcolor=#E9E9E9
| 355521 ||  || — || January 11, 2008 || Kitt Peak || Spacewatch || — || align=right | 2.7 km || 
|-id=522 bgcolor=#E9E9E9
| 355522 ||  || — || November 5, 2007 || Mount Lemmon || Mount Lemmon Survey || — || align=right | 2.2 km || 
|-id=523 bgcolor=#E9E9E9
| 355523 ||  || — || December 31, 2007 || Mount Lemmon || Mount Lemmon Survey || — || align=right | 1.8 km || 
|-id=524 bgcolor=#d6d6d6
| 355524 ||  || — || January 11, 2008 || Kitt Peak || Spacewatch || KOR || align=right | 1.4 km || 
|-id=525 bgcolor=#E9E9E9
| 355525 ||  || — || January 11, 2008 || Mount Lemmon || Mount Lemmon Survey || — || align=right | 3.0 km || 
|-id=526 bgcolor=#E9E9E9
| 355526 ||  || — || January 11, 2008 || Mount Lemmon || Mount Lemmon Survey || — || align=right | 2.0 km || 
|-id=527 bgcolor=#d6d6d6
| 355527 ||  || — || January 12, 2008 || Kitt Peak || Spacewatch || BRA || align=right | 3.0 km || 
|-id=528 bgcolor=#d6d6d6
| 355528 ||  || — || January 15, 2008 || Kitt Peak || Spacewatch || — || align=right | 3.0 km || 
|-id=529 bgcolor=#d6d6d6
| 355529 ||  || — || January 13, 2008 || Kitt Peak || Spacewatch || KOR || align=right | 1.3 km || 
|-id=530 bgcolor=#d6d6d6
| 355530 ||  || — || January 13, 2008 || Kitt Peak || Spacewatch || — || align=right | 3.0 km || 
|-id=531 bgcolor=#E9E9E9
| 355531 ||  || — || December 31, 2007 || Kitt Peak || Spacewatch || MRX || align=right | 1.1 km || 
|-id=532 bgcolor=#E9E9E9
| 355532 ||  || — || January 14, 2008 || Kitt Peak || Spacewatch || — || align=right | 2.2 km || 
|-id=533 bgcolor=#E9E9E9
| 355533 ||  || — || January 14, 2008 || Kitt Peak || Spacewatch || — || align=right | 2.0 km || 
|-id=534 bgcolor=#E9E9E9
| 355534 ||  || — || January 15, 2008 || Mount Lemmon || Mount Lemmon Survey || HNA || align=right | 2.3 km || 
|-id=535 bgcolor=#E9E9E9
| 355535 ||  || — || November 8, 2007 || Mount Lemmon || Mount Lemmon Survey || AGN || align=right | 1.6 km || 
|-id=536 bgcolor=#d6d6d6
| 355536 ||  || — || June 17, 2005 || Mount Lemmon || Mount Lemmon Survey || — || align=right | 2.8 km || 
|-id=537 bgcolor=#d6d6d6
| 355537 ||  || — || January 15, 2008 || Mount Lemmon || Mount Lemmon Survey || — || align=right | 2.3 km || 
|-id=538 bgcolor=#d6d6d6
| 355538 ||  || — || January 11, 2008 || Catalina || CSS || TRE || align=right | 3.1 km || 
|-id=539 bgcolor=#d6d6d6
| 355539 ||  || — || January 12, 2008 || Mount Lemmon || Mount Lemmon Survey || — || align=right | 3.1 km || 
|-id=540 bgcolor=#E9E9E9
| 355540 ||  || — || January 15, 2008 || Socorro || LINEAR || — || align=right | 2.8 km || 
|-id=541 bgcolor=#E9E9E9
| 355541 ||  || — || January 16, 2008 || Kitt Peak || Spacewatch || MRX || align=right | 1.2 km || 
|-id=542 bgcolor=#E9E9E9
| 355542 ||  || — || January 18, 2008 || Kitt Peak || Spacewatch || DOR || align=right | 2.5 km || 
|-id=543 bgcolor=#E9E9E9
| 355543 ||  || — || January 19, 2008 || Mount Lemmon || Mount Lemmon Survey || HOF || align=right | 2.6 km || 
|-id=544 bgcolor=#E9E9E9
| 355544 ||  || — || November 11, 2007 || Mount Lemmon || Mount Lemmon Survey || AGN || align=right | 1.2 km || 
|-id=545 bgcolor=#d6d6d6
| 355545 ||  || — || January 30, 2008 || Mount Lemmon || Mount Lemmon Survey || — || align=right | 2.2 km || 
|-id=546 bgcolor=#d6d6d6
| 355546 ||  || — || January 30, 2008 || Mount Lemmon || Mount Lemmon Survey || — || align=right | 2.9 km || 
|-id=547 bgcolor=#FA8072
| 355547 ||  || — || January 31, 2008 || Mount Lemmon || Mount Lemmon Survey || H || align=right data-sort-value="0.75" | 750 m || 
|-id=548 bgcolor=#fefefe
| 355548 ||  || — || January 31, 2008 || Costitx || OAM Obs. || H || align=right data-sort-value="0.65" | 650 m || 
|-id=549 bgcolor=#d6d6d6
| 355549 ||  || — || January 30, 2008 || Mount Lemmon || Mount Lemmon Survey || — || align=right | 2.1 km || 
|-id=550 bgcolor=#d6d6d6
| 355550 ||  || — || January 30, 2008 || Mount Lemmon || Mount Lemmon Survey || — || align=right | 2.2 km || 
|-id=551 bgcolor=#d6d6d6
| 355551 ||  || — || January 30, 2008 || Mount Lemmon || Mount Lemmon Survey || — || align=right | 3.8 km || 
|-id=552 bgcolor=#d6d6d6
| 355552 ||  || — || January 31, 2008 || Mount Lemmon || Mount Lemmon Survey || EUP || align=right | 5.6 km || 
|-id=553 bgcolor=#d6d6d6
| 355553 ||  || — || February 1, 2008 || Kitt Peak || Spacewatch || — || align=right | 3.1 km || 
|-id=554 bgcolor=#d6d6d6
| 355554 ||  || — || February 2, 2008 || Kitt Peak || Spacewatch || — || align=right | 5.2 km || 
|-id=555 bgcolor=#d6d6d6
| 355555 ||  || — || February 3, 2008 || Kitt Peak || Spacewatch || EOS || align=right | 2.1 km || 
|-id=556 bgcolor=#d6d6d6
| 355556 ||  || — || February 3, 2008 || Kitt Peak || Spacewatch || — || align=right | 3.3 km || 
|-id=557 bgcolor=#d6d6d6
| 355557 ||  || — || February 3, 2008 || Kitt Peak || Spacewatch || NAE || align=right | 5.7 km || 
|-id=558 bgcolor=#d6d6d6
| 355558 ||  || — || February 3, 2008 || Kitt Peak || Spacewatch || — || align=right | 3.2 km || 
|-id=559 bgcolor=#E9E9E9
| 355559 ||  || — || February 6, 2008 || Junk Bond || D. Healy || — || align=right | 1.9 km || 
|-id=560 bgcolor=#d6d6d6
| 355560 ||  || — || January 13, 2008 || Kitt Peak || Spacewatch || — || align=right | 2.3 km || 
|-id=561 bgcolor=#d6d6d6
| 355561 ||  || — || February 2, 2008 || Kitt Peak || Spacewatch || BRA || align=right | 1.5 km || 
|-id=562 bgcolor=#d6d6d6
| 355562 ||  || — || February 2, 2008 || Kitt Peak || Spacewatch || CHA || align=right | 2.5 km || 
|-id=563 bgcolor=#d6d6d6
| 355563 ||  || — || December 14, 2007 || Mount Lemmon || Mount Lemmon Survey || — || align=right | 3.7 km || 
|-id=564 bgcolor=#d6d6d6
| 355564 ||  || — || February 2, 2008 || Kitt Peak || Spacewatch || EUP || align=right | 5.5 km || 
|-id=565 bgcolor=#d6d6d6
| 355565 ||  || — || February 7, 2002 || Kitt Peak || Spacewatch || VER || align=right | 2.9 km || 
|-id=566 bgcolor=#d6d6d6
| 355566 ||  || — || February 2, 2008 || Kitt Peak || Spacewatch || — || align=right | 2.8 km || 
|-id=567 bgcolor=#d6d6d6
| 355567 ||  || — || February 7, 2008 || Mount Lemmon || Mount Lemmon Survey || EOS || align=right | 1.6 km || 
|-id=568 bgcolor=#d6d6d6
| 355568 ||  || — || November 25, 2006 || Kitt Peak || Spacewatch || HYG || align=right | 2.5 km || 
|-id=569 bgcolor=#E9E9E9
| 355569 ||  || — || February 8, 2008 || Mount Lemmon || Mount Lemmon Survey || — || align=right | 2.5 km || 
|-id=570 bgcolor=#d6d6d6
| 355570 ||  || — || February 8, 2008 || Mount Lemmon || Mount Lemmon Survey || — || align=right | 3.7 km || 
|-id=571 bgcolor=#d6d6d6
| 355571 ||  || — || February 3, 2008 || Kitt Peak || Spacewatch || — || align=right | 3.8 km || 
|-id=572 bgcolor=#E9E9E9
| 355572 ||  || — || February 6, 2008 || Catalina || CSS || MRX || align=right | 1.6 km || 
|-id=573 bgcolor=#d6d6d6
| 355573 ||  || — || September 12, 2005 || Kitt Peak || Spacewatch || — || align=right | 2.9 km || 
|-id=574 bgcolor=#d6d6d6
| 355574 ||  || — || February 7, 2008 || Kitt Peak || Spacewatch || THB || align=right | 3.7 km || 
|-id=575 bgcolor=#d6d6d6
| 355575 ||  || — || February 2, 2008 || Kitt Peak || Spacewatch || — || align=right | 2.1 km || 
|-id=576 bgcolor=#d6d6d6
| 355576 ||  || — || February 7, 2008 || Mount Lemmon || Mount Lemmon Survey || — || align=right | 2.7 km || 
|-id=577 bgcolor=#d6d6d6
| 355577 ||  || — || February 8, 2008 || Mount Lemmon || Mount Lemmon Survey || — || align=right | 3.3 km || 
|-id=578 bgcolor=#d6d6d6
| 355578 ||  || — || February 9, 2008 || Kitt Peak || Spacewatch || KOR || align=right | 1.3 km || 
|-id=579 bgcolor=#d6d6d6
| 355579 ||  || — || February 9, 2008 || Kitt Peak || Spacewatch || KOR || align=right | 1.4 km || 
|-id=580 bgcolor=#d6d6d6
| 355580 ||  || — || February 9, 2008 || Kitt Peak || Spacewatch || — || align=right | 3.0 km || 
|-id=581 bgcolor=#d6d6d6
| 355581 ||  || — || February 9, 2008 || Kitt Peak || Spacewatch || — || align=right | 6.8 km || 
|-id=582 bgcolor=#d6d6d6
| 355582 ||  || — || February 10, 2008 || Kitt Peak || Spacewatch || — || align=right | 2.8 km || 
|-id=583 bgcolor=#d6d6d6
| 355583 ||  || — || February 10, 2008 || Kitt Peak || Spacewatch || — || align=right | 2.4 km || 
|-id=584 bgcolor=#d6d6d6
| 355584 ||  || — || April 1, 2003 || Apache Point || SDSS || — || align=right | 3.2 km || 
|-id=585 bgcolor=#E9E9E9
| 355585 ||  || — || February 8, 2008 || Kitt Peak || Spacewatch || GEF || align=right | 1.5 km || 
|-id=586 bgcolor=#d6d6d6
| 355586 ||  || — || August 30, 2005 || Kitt Peak || Spacewatch || EOS || align=right | 2.1 km || 
|-id=587 bgcolor=#d6d6d6
| 355587 ||  || — || October 5, 2005 || Kitt Peak || Spacewatch || — || align=right | 3.3 km || 
|-id=588 bgcolor=#d6d6d6
| 355588 ||  || — || February 8, 2008 || Kitt Peak || Spacewatch || — || align=right | 3.3 km || 
|-id=589 bgcolor=#d6d6d6
| 355589 ||  || — || February 8, 2008 || Kitt Peak || Spacewatch || — || align=right | 3.3 km || 
|-id=590 bgcolor=#d6d6d6
| 355590 ||  || — || January 30, 2008 || Mount Lemmon || Mount Lemmon Survey || — || align=right | 3.4 km || 
|-id=591 bgcolor=#d6d6d6
| 355591 ||  || — || February 8, 2008 || Kitt Peak || Spacewatch || — || align=right | 3.0 km || 
|-id=592 bgcolor=#d6d6d6
| 355592 ||  || — || February 9, 2008 || Kitt Peak || Spacewatch || EOS || align=right | 2.3 km || 
|-id=593 bgcolor=#d6d6d6
| 355593 ||  || — || February 9, 2008 || Kitt Peak || Spacewatch || — || align=right | 3.0 km || 
|-id=594 bgcolor=#d6d6d6
| 355594 ||  || — || September 11, 2005 || Kitt Peak || Spacewatch || — || align=right | 2.8 km || 
|-id=595 bgcolor=#d6d6d6
| 355595 ||  || — || February 6, 2008 || Purple Mountain || PMO NEO || — || align=right | 4.6 km || 
|-id=596 bgcolor=#d6d6d6
| 355596 ||  || — || February 11, 2008 || Mount Lemmon || Mount Lemmon Survey || — || align=right | 3.2 km || 
|-id=597 bgcolor=#d6d6d6
| 355597 ||  || — || February 6, 2008 || Catalina || CSS || — || align=right | 3.3 km || 
|-id=598 bgcolor=#d6d6d6
| 355598 ||  || — || February 2, 2008 || Kitt Peak || Spacewatch || CHA || align=right | 2.2 km || 
|-id=599 bgcolor=#d6d6d6
| 355599 ||  || — || February 12, 2008 || Mount Lemmon || Mount Lemmon Survey || LIX || align=right | 3.9 km || 
|-id=600 bgcolor=#d6d6d6
| 355600 ||  || — || February 13, 2008 || Kitt Peak || Spacewatch || — || align=right | 2.4 km || 
|}

355601–355700 

|-bgcolor=#d6d6d6
| 355601 ||  || — || February 8, 2008 || Kitt Peak || Spacewatch || — || align=right | 3.1 km || 
|-id=602 bgcolor=#d6d6d6
| 355602 ||  || — || February 9, 2008 || Mount Lemmon || Mount Lemmon Survey || — || align=right | 3.1 km || 
|-id=603 bgcolor=#d6d6d6
| 355603 ||  || — || February 13, 2008 || Socorro || LINEAR || — || align=right | 5.0 km || 
|-id=604 bgcolor=#d6d6d6
| 355604 ||  || — || February 25, 2008 || Kitt Peak || Spacewatch || EUP || align=right | 4.4 km || 
|-id=605 bgcolor=#d6d6d6
| 355605 ||  || — || February 26, 2008 || Kitt Peak || Spacewatch || — || align=right | 2.5 km || 
|-id=606 bgcolor=#d6d6d6
| 355606 ||  || — || January 22, 2002 || Kitt Peak || Spacewatch || — || align=right | 3.7 km || 
|-id=607 bgcolor=#d6d6d6
| 355607 ||  || — || November 19, 2007 || Kitt Peak || Spacewatch || TEL || align=right | 1.6 km || 
|-id=608 bgcolor=#fefefe
| 355608 ||  || — || February 29, 2008 || Purple Mountain || PMO NEO || H || align=right data-sort-value="0.79" | 790 m || 
|-id=609 bgcolor=#d6d6d6
| 355609 ||  || — || February 29, 2008 || Catalina || CSS || — || align=right | 4.3 km || 
|-id=610 bgcolor=#d6d6d6
| 355610 ||  || — || February 27, 2008 || Mount Lemmon || Mount Lemmon Survey || — || align=right | 4.9 km || 
|-id=611 bgcolor=#d6d6d6
| 355611 ||  || — || February 27, 2008 || Kitt Peak || Spacewatch || — || align=right | 3.6 km || 
|-id=612 bgcolor=#d6d6d6
| 355612 ||  || — || February 27, 2008 || Kitt Peak || Spacewatch || EOS || align=right | 2.1 km || 
|-id=613 bgcolor=#d6d6d6
| 355613 ||  || — || November 20, 2007 || Mount Lemmon || Mount Lemmon Survey || — || align=right | 3.3 km || 
|-id=614 bgcolor=#d6d6d6
| 355614 ||  || — || February 27, 2008 || Catalina || CSS || Tj (2.96) || align=right | 3.1 km || 
|-id=615 bgcolor=#d6d6d6
| 355615 ||  || — || February 27, 2008 || Mount Lemmon || Mount Lemmon Survey || THM || align=right | 2.3 km || 
|-id=616 bgcolor=#d6d6d6
| 355616 ||  || — || February 27, 2008 || Mount Lemmon || Mount Lemmon Survey || — || align=right | 2.3 km || 
|-id=617 bgcolor=#d6d6d6
| 355617 ||  || — || February 27, 2008 || Mount Lemmon || Mount Lemmon Survey || THM || align=right | 2.3 km || 
|-id=618 bgcolor=#d6d6d6
| 355618 ||  || — || February 27, 2008 || Mount Lemmon || Mount Lemmon Survey || — || align=right | 2.9 km || 
|-id=619 bgcolor=#d6d6d6
| 355619 ||  || — || February 18, 2008 || Mount Lemmon || Mount Lemmon Survey || — || align=right | 4.1 km || 
|-id=620 bgcolor=#d6d6d6
| 355620 ||  || — || February 28, 2008 || Mount Lemmon || Mount Lemmon Survey || — || align=right | 2.4 km || 
|-id=621 bgcolor=#d6d6d6
| 355621 ||  || — || February 28, 2008 || Catalina || CSS || BRA || align=right | 2.0 km || 
|-id=622 bgcolor=#d6d6d6
| 355622 ||  || — || February 27, 2008 || Kitt Peak || Spacewatch || — || align=right | 4.4 km || 
|-id=623 bgcolor=#d6d6d6
| 355623 ||  || — || February 29, 2008 || Catalina || CSS || — || align=right | 3.8 km || 
|-id=624 bgcolor=#d6d6d6
| 355624 ||  || — || February 29, 2008 || Kitt Peak || Spacewatch || — || align=right | 2.4 km || 
|-id=625 bgcolor=#d6d6d6
| 355625 ||  || — || December 1, 2006 || Mount Lemmon || Mount Lemmon Survey || — || align=right | 2.4 km || 
|-id=626 bgcolor=#d6d6d6
| 355626 ||  || — || February 26, 2008 || Mount Lemmon || Mount Lemmon Survey || — || align=right | 2.3 km || 
|-id=627 bgcolor=#d6d6d6
| 355627 ||  || — || February 18, 2008 || Mount Lemmon || Mount Lemmon Survey || — || align=right | 3.0 km || 
|-id=628 bgcolor=#d6d6d6
| 355628 ||  || — || February 28, 2008 || Kitt Peak || Spacewatch || — || align=right | 2.1 km || 
|-id=629 bgcolor=#d6d6d6
| 355629 ||  || — || February 28, 2008 || Kitt Peak || Spacewatch || TIR || align=right | 2.8 km || 
|-id=630 bgcolor=#fefefe
| 355630 || 2008 EB || — || March 1, 2008 || Pla D'Arguines || R. Ferrando || H || align=right data-sort-value="0.91" | 910 m || 
|-id=631 bgcolor=#d6d6d6
| 355631 ||  || — || February 3, 2008 || Mount Lemmon || Mount Lemmon Survey || — || align=right | 4.1 km || 
|-id=632 bgcolor=#d6d6d6
| 355632 ||  || — || March 6, 2008 || Pla D'Arguines || R. Ferrando || — || align=right | 4.5 km || 
|-id=633 bgcolor=#d6d6d6
| 355633 ||  || — || March 1, 2008 || Kitt Peak || Spacewatch || — || align=right | 3.9 km || 
|-id=634 bgcolor=#d6d6d6
| 355634 ||  || — || March 1, 2008 || Kitt Peak || Spacewatch || EUP || align=right | 4.2 km || 
|-id=635 bgcolor=#d6d6d6
| 355635 ||  || — || March 3, 2008 || Catalina || CSS || — || align=right | 4.2 km || 
|-id=636 bgcolor=#d6d6d6
| 355636 ||  || — || March 3, 2008 || Purple Mountain || PMO NEO || — || align=right | 4.1 km || 
|-id=637 bgcolor=#d6d6d6
| 355637 ||  || — || March 4, 2008 || Catalina || CSS || — || align=right | 3.8 km || 
|-id=638 bgcolor=#d6d6d6
| 355638 ||  || — || March 4, 2008 || Mount Lemmon || Mount Lemmon Survey || — || align=right | 3.0 km || 
|-id=639 bgcolor=#d6d6d6
| 355639 ||  || — || March 2, 2008 || Mount Lemmon || Mount Lemmon Survey || — || align=right | 2.9 km || 
|-id=640 bgcolor=#d6d6d6
| 355640 ||  || — || March 4, 2008 || Kitt Peak || Spacewatch || — || align=right | 3.3 km || 
|-id=641 bgcolor=#d6d6d6
| 355641 ||  || — || March 4, 2008 || Mount Lemmon || Mount Lemmon Survey || — || align=right | 4.0 km || 
|-id=642 bgcolor=#fefefe
| 355642 ||  || — || March 5, 2008 || Mount Lemmon || Mount Lemmon Survey || H || align=right data-sort-value="0.71" | 710 m || 
|-id=643 bgcolor=#d6d6d6
| 355643 ||  || — || March 5, 2008 || Kitt Peak || Spacewatch || EOS || align=right | 2.5 km || 
|-id=644 bgcolor=#d6d6d6
| 355644 ||  || — || March 5, 2008 || Mount Lemmon || Mount Lemmon Survey || — || align=right | 3.5 km || 
|-id=645 bgcolor=#d6d6d6
| 355645 ||  || — || February 27, 2008 || Mount Lemmon || Mount Lemmon Survey || — || align=right | 2.4 km || 
|-id=646 bgcolor=#d6d6d6
| 355646 ||  || — || March 7, 2008 || Mount Lemmon || Mount Lemmon Survey || — || align=right | 2.2 km || 
|-id=647 bgcolor=#d6d6d6
| 355647 ||  || — || March 17, 1996 || Kitt Peak || Spacewatch || — || align=right | 3.6 km || 
|-id=648 bgcolor=#d6d6d6
| 355648 ||  || — || March 8, 2008 || Catalina || CSS || — || align=right | 3.7 km || 
|-id=649 bgcolor=#d6d6d6
| 355649 ||  || — || March 8, 2008 || Catalina || CSS || URS || align=right | 4.4 km || 
|-id=650 bgcolor=#d6d6d6
| 355650 ||  || — || March 9, 2008 || Kitt Peak || Spacewatch || HYG || align=right | 2.9 km || 
|-id=651 bgcolor=#d6d6d6
| 355651 ||  || — || March 9, 2008 || Mount Lemmon || Mount Lemmon Survey || — || align=right | 3.7 km || 
|-id=652 bgcolor=#d6d6d6
| 355652 ||  || — || March 9, 2008 || Mount Lemmon || Mount Lemmon Survey || — || align=right | 3.1 km || 
|-id=653 bgcolor=#fefefe
| 355653 ||  || — || March 11, 2008 || Catalina || CSS || H || align=right data-sort-value="0.84" | 840 m || 
|-id=654 bgcolor=#d6d6d6
| 355654 ||  || — || March 7, 2008 || Kitt Peak || Spacewatch || — || align=right | 5.2 km || 
|-id=655 bgcolor=#d6d6d6
| 355655 ||  || — || March 5, 2008 || Mount Lemmon || Mount Lemmon Survey || HYG || align=right | 2.3 km || 
|-id=656 bgcolor=#d6d6d6
| 355656 ||  || — || March 7, 2008 || Catalina || CSS || — || align=right | 3.4 km || 
|-id=657 bgcolor=#d6d6d6
| 355657 ||  || — || April 1, 2003 || Kitt Peak || L. H. Wasserman || — || align=right | 3.8 km || 
|-id=658 bgcolor=#d6d6d6
| 355658 ||  || — || March 10, 2008 || Socorro || LINEAR || — || align=right | 4.0 km || 
|-id=659 bgcolor=#d6d6d6
| 355659 ||  || — || March 6, 2008 || Catalina || CSS || — || align=right | 3.8 km || 
|-id=660 bgcolor=#d6d6d6
| 355660 ||  || — || March 7, 2008 || Kitt Peak || Spacewatch || — || align=right | 3.6 km || 
|-id=661 bgcolor=#d6d6d6
| 355661 ||  || — || March 8, 2008 || Kitt Peak || Spacewatch || — || align=right | 4.8 km || 
|-id=662 bgcolor=#d6d6d6
| 355662 ||  || — || March 8, 2008 || Kitt Peak || Spacewatch || — || align=right | 3.1 km || 
|-id=663 bgcolor=#d6d6d6
| 355663 ||  || — || March 8, 2008 || Kitt Peak || Spacewatch || EOS || align=right | 2.1 km || 
|-id=664 bgcolor=#d6d6d6
| 355664 ||  || — || March 9, 2008 || Mount Lemmon || Mount Lemmon Survey || KOR || align=right | 1.1 km || 
|-id=665 bgcolor=#d6d6d6
| 355665 ||  || — || March 9, 2008 || Kitt Peak || Spacewatch || — || align=right | 2.8 km || 
|-id=666 bgcolor=#d6d6d6
| 355666 ||  || — || March 9, 2008 || Kitt Peak || Spacewatch || — || align=right | 3.9 km || 
|-id=667 bgcolor=#d6d6d6
| 355667 ||  || — || March 10, 2008 || Kitt Peak || Spacewatch || — || align=right | 3.7 km || 
|-id=668 bgcolor=#d6d6d6
| 355668 ||  || — || March 11, 2008 || Kitt Peak || Spacewatch || — || align=right | 3.4 km || 
|-id=669 bgcolor=#d6d6d6
| 355669 ||  || — || March 11, 2008 || Kitt Peak || Spacewatch || — || align=right | 3.2 km || 
|-id=670 bgcolor=#d6d6d6
| 355670 ||  || — || March 11, 2008 || Kitt Peak || Spacewatch || — || align=right | 3.2 km || 
|-id=671 bgcolor=#d6d6d6
| 355671 ||  || — || March 11, 2008 || Catalina || CSS || LAU || align=right | 1.0 km || 
|-id=672 bgcolor=#d6d6d6
| 355672 ||  || — || March 11, 2008 || Kitt Peak || Spacewatch || — || align=right | 3.2 km || 
|-id=673 bgcolor=#d6d6d6
| 355673 ||  || — || March 11, 2008 || Kitt Peak || Spacewatch || — || align=right | 4.2 km || 
|-id=674 bgcolor=#d6d6d6
| 355674 ||  || — || March 6, 2008 || Mount Lemmon || Mount Lemmon Survey || — || align=right | 2.7 km || 
|-id=675 bgcolor=#d6d6d6
| 355675 ||  || — || March 15, 2008 || Kitt Peak || Spacewatch || — || align=right | 3.7 km || 
|-id=676 bgcolor=#d6d6d6
| 355676 ||  || — || March 1, 2008 || Kitt Peak || Spacewatch || URS || align=right | 3.9 km || 
|-id=677 bgcolor=#d6d6d6
| 355677 ||  || — || March 8, 2008 || Kitt Peak || Spacewatch || — || align=right | 2.8 km || 
|-id=678 bgcolor=#d6d6d6
| 355678 ||  || — || March 2, 2008 || Catalina || CSS || — || align=right | 3.7 km || 
|-id=679 bgcolor=#d6d6d6
| 355679 ||  || — || March 4, 2008 || Mount Lemmon || Mount Lemmon Survey || VER || align=right | 3.8 km || 
|-id=680 bgcolor=#d6d6d6
| 355680 ||  || — || March 15, 2008 || Mount Lemmon || Mount Lemmon Survey || HYG || align=right | 3.1 km || 
|-id=681 bgcolor=#d6d6d6
| 355681 ||  || — || March 25, 2008 || Kitt Peak || Spacewatch || — || align=right | 4.2 km || 
|-id=682 bgcolor=#d6d6d6
| 355682 ||  || — || March 25, 2008 || Kitt Peak || Spacewatch || — || align=right | 3.4 km || 
|-id=683 bgcolor=#d6d6d6
| 355683 ||  || — || March 28, 2008 || Andrushivka || Andrushivka Obs. || EOS || align=right | 2.5 km || 
|-id=684 bgcolor=#d6d6d6
| 355684 ||  || — || March 26, 2008 || Kitt Peak || Spacewatch || EOS || align=right | 1.8 km || 
|-id=685 bgcolor=#E9E9E9
| 355685 ||  || — || March 26, 2008 || Mount Lemmon || Mount Lemmon Survey || — || align=right | 2.7 km || 
|-id=686 bgcolor=#d6d6d6
| 355686 ||  || — || March 26, 2008 || Mount Lemmon || Mount Lemmon Survey || TRE || align=right | 2.2 km || 
|-id=687 bgcolor=#d6d6d6
| 355687 ||  || — || March 27, 2008 || Kitt Peak || Spacewatch || — || align=right | 2.6 km || 
|-id=688 bgcolor=#d6d6d6
| 355688 ||  || — || February 7, 2008 || Kitt Peak || Spacewatch || HYG || align=right | 2.7 km || 
|-id=689 bgcolor=#d6d6d6
| 355689 ||  || — || March 27, 2008 || Mount Lemmon || Mount Lemmon Survey || — || align=right | 2.6 km || 
|-id=690 bgcolor=#d6d6d6
| 355690 ||  || — || March 27, 2008 || Kitt Peak || Spacewatch || — || align=right | 3.4 km || 
|-id=691 bgcolor=#d6d6d6
| 355691 ||  || — || March 27, 2008 || Kitt Peak || Spacewatch || — || align=right | 2.6 km || 
|-id=692 bgcolor=#d6d6d6
| 355692 ||  || — || March 27, 2008 || Kitt Peak || Spacewatch || — || align=right | 4.2 km || 
|-id=693 bgcolor=#d6d6d6
| 355693 ||  || — || March 28, 2008 || Mount Lemmon || Mount Lemmon Survey || HYG || align=right | 2.9 km || 
|-id=694 bgcolor=#d6d6d6
| 355694 ||  || — || March 28, 2008 || Mount Lemmon || Mount Lemmon Survey || — || align=right | 3.1 km || 
|-id=695 bgcolor=#d6d6d6
| 355695 ||  || — || March 28, 2008 || Kitt Peak || Spacewatch || HYG || align=right | 3.1 km || 
|-id=696 bgcolor=#d6d6d6
| 355696 ||  || — || March 28, 2008 || Mount Lemmon || Mount Lemmon Survey || — || align=right | 2.8 km || 
|-id=697 bgcolor=#d6d6d6
| 355697 ||  || — || March 28, 2008 || Mount Lemmon || Mount Lemmon Survey || — || align=right | 3.2 km || 
|-id=698 bgcolor=#d6d6d6
| 355698 ||  || — || March 1, 2008 || Kitt Peak || Spacewatch || HYG || align=right | 2.7 km || 
|-id=699 bgcolor=#d6d6d6
| 355699 ||  || — || March 28, 2008 || Mount Lemmon || Mount Lemmon Survey || — || align=right | 3.7 km || 
|-id=700 bgcolor=#d6d6d6
| 355700 ||  || — || March 28, 2008 || Mount Lemmon || Mount Lemmon Survey || — || align=right | 2.9 km || 
|}

355701–355800 

|-bgcolor=#d6d6d6
| 355701 ||  || — || March 28, 2008 || Mount Lemmon || Mount Lemmon Survey || THM || align=right | 2.6 km || 
|-id=702 bgcolor=#fefefe
| 355702 ||  || — || March 29, 2008 || Mount Lemmon || Mount Lemmon Survey || H || align=right data-sort-value="0.72" | 720 m || 
|-id=703 bgcolor=#d6d6d6
| 355703 ||  || — || March 27, 2008 || Kitt Peak || Spacewatch || — || align=right | 3.3 km || 
|-id=704 bgcolor=#d6d6d6
| 355704 Wangyinglai ||  ||  || March 3, 2008 || XuYi || PMO NEO || — || align=right | 3.5 km || 
|-id=705 bgcolor=#d6d6d6
| 355705 ||  || — || March 28, 2008 || Mount Lemmon || Mount Lemmon Survey || THM || align=right | 2.2 km || 
|-id=706 bgcolor=#d6d6d6
| 355706 ||  || — || March 28, 2008 || Mount Lemmon || Mount Lemmon Survey || THM || align=right | 2.1 km || 
|-id=707 bgcolor=#d6d6d6
| 355707 ||  || — || March 28, 2008 || Mount Lemmon || Mount Lemmon Survey || — || align=right | 2.9 km || 
|-id=708 bgcolor=#d6d6d6
| 355708 ||  || — || March 29, 2008 || Kitt Peak || Spacewatch || — || align=right | 4.2 km || 
|-id=709 bgcolor=#d6d6d6
| 355709 ||  || — || March 30, 2008 || Kitt Peak || Spacewatch || HYG || align=right | 3.0 km || 
|-id=710 bgcolor=#d6d6d6
| 355710 ||  || — || March 31, 2008 || Kitt Peak || Spacewatch || fast? || align=right | 4.1 km || 
|-id=711 bgcolor=#d6d6d6
| 355711 ||  || — || March 31, 2008 || Mount Lemmon || Mount Lemmon Survey || THB || align=right | 2.6 km || 
|-id=712 bgcolor=#d6d6d6
| 355712 ||  || — || March 31, 2008 || Kitt Peak || Spacewatch || — || align=right | 2.9 km || 
|-id=713 bgcolor=#d6d6d6
| 355713 ||  || — || March 31, 2008 || Catalina || CSS || MEL || align=right | 6.0 km || 
|-id=714 bgcolor=#d6d6d6
| 355714 ||  || — || March 26, 2008 || Kitt Peak || Spacewatch || — || align=right | 3.9 km || 
|-id=715 bgcolor=#d6d6d6
| 355715 ||  || — || March 28, 2008 || Kitt Peak || Spacewatch || THM || align=right | 2.5 km || 
|-id=716 bgcolor=#d6d6d6
| 355716 ||  || — || March 30, 2008 || Catalina || CSS || — || align=right | 3.7 km || 
|-id=717 bgcolor=#d6d6d6
| 355717 ||  || — || February 28, 2008 || Kitt Peak || Spacewatch || — || align=right | 3.2 km || 
|-id=718 bgcolor=#d6d6d6
| 355718 ||  || — || March 31, 2008 || Catalina || CSS || — || align=right | 3.7 km || 
|-id=719 bgcolor=#d6d6d6
| 355719 ||  || — || March 27, 2008 || Kitt Peak || Spacewatch || — || align=right | 5.9 km || 
|-id=720 bgcolor=#d6d6d6
| 355720 ||  || — || April 1, 2008 || Kitt Peak || Spacewatch || — || align=right | 2.9 km || 
|-id=721 bgcolor=#d6d6d6
| 355721 ||  || — || September 1, 2005 || Kitt Peak || Spacewatch || — || align=right | 3.0 km || 
|-id=722 bgcolor=#d6d6d6
| 355722 ||  || — || April 1, 2008 || Mount Lemmon || Mount Lemmon Survey || HYG || align=right | 2.7 km || 
|-id=723 bgcolor=#d6d6d6
| 355723 ||  || — || April 3, 2008 || Kitt Peak || Spacewatch || — || align=right | 4.1 km || 
|-id=724 bgcolor=#d6d6d6
| 355724 ||  || — || April 3, 2008 || Kitt Peak || Spacewatch || EOS || align=right | 2.3 km || 
|-id=725 bgcolor=#d6d6d6
| 355725 ||  || — || April 3, 2008 || Kitt Peak || Spacewatch || — || align=right | 2.9 km || 
|-id=726 bgcolor=#d6d6d6
| 355726 ||  || — || April 5, 2008 || Mount Lemmon || Mount Lemmon Survey || — || align=right | 2.6 km || 
|-id=727 bgcolor=#d6d6d6
| 355727 ||  || — || April 5, 2008 || Catalina || CSS || — || align=right | 3.1 km || 
|-id=728 bgcolor=#d6d6d6
| 355728 ||  || — || April 6, 2008 || Mount Lemmon || Mount Lemmon Survey || 7:4 || align=right | 5.3 km || 
|-id=729 bgcolor=#d6d6d6
| 355729 ||  || — || April 6, 2008 || Mount Lemmon || Mount Lemmon Survey || — || align=right | 5.2 km || 
|-id=730 bgcolor=#d6d6d6
| 355730 ||  || — || April 8, 2008 || Kitt Peak || Spacewatch || — || align=right | 2.8 km || 
|-id=731 bgcolor=#fefefe
| 355731 ||  || — || April 3, 2008 || Catalina || CSS || H || align=right data-sort-value="0.93" | 930 m || 
|-id=732 bgcolor=#fefefe
| 355732 ||  || — || April 3, 2008 || Catalina || CSS || H || align=right data-sort-value="0.93" | 930 m || 
|-id=733 bgcolor=#d6d6d6
| 355733 ||  || — || April 1, 2008 || Catalina || CSS || ALA || align=right | 3.6 km || 
|-id=734 bgcolor=#d6d6d6
| 355734 ||  || — || February 12, 2008 || Mount Lemmon || Mount Lemmon Survey || — || align=right | 3.7 km || 
|-id=735 bgcolor=#d6d6d6
| 355735 ||  || — || April 12, 2008 || Catalina || CSS || HYG || align=right | 3.6 km || 
|-id=736 bgcolor=#d6d6d6
| 355736 ||  || — || April 13, 2008 || Kitt Peak || Spacewatch || — || align=right | 3.1 km || 
|-id=737 bgcolor=#d6d6d6
| 355737 ||  || — || March 29, 2008 || Catalina || CSS || — || align=right | 4.4 km || 
|-id=738 bgcolor=#d6d6d6
| 355738 ||  || — || April 4, 2008 || Catalina || CSS || — || align=right | 2.5 km || 
|-id=739 bgcolor=#d6d6d6
| 355739 ||  || — || April 24, 2008 || Mount Lemmon || Mount Lemmon Survey || — || align=right | 3.5 km || 
|-id=740 bgcolor=#d6d6d6
| 355740 ||  || — || April 28, 2008 || La Sagra || OAM Obs. || — || align=right | 3.1 km || 
|-id=741 bgcolor=#d6d6d6
| 355741 ||  || — || April 24, 2008 || Kitt Peak || Spacewatch || — || align=right | 3.2 km || 
|-id=742 bgcolor=#d6d6d6
| 355742 ||  || — || April 24, 2008 || Kitt Peak || Spacewatch || LIX || align=right | 3.7 km || 
|-id=743 bgcolor=#d6d6d6
| 355743 ||  || — || April 25, 2008 || Kitt Peak || Spacewatch || — || align=right | 3.3 km || 
|-id=744 bgcolor=#d6d6d6
| 355744 ||  || — || April 27, 2008 || Kitt Peak || Spacewatch || VER || align=right | 2.2 km || 
|-id=745 bgcolor=#d6d6d6
| 355745 ||  || — || April 29, 2008 || Kitt Peak || Spacewatch || — || align=right | 2.8 km || 
|-id=746 bgcolor=#d6d6d6
| 355746 ||  || — || September 7, 2004 || Kitt Peak || Spacewatch || — || align=right | 2.9 km || 
|-id=747 bgcolor=#d6d6d6
| 355747 ||  || — || April 29, 2008 || Kitt Peak || Spacewatch || LIX || align=right | 4.2 km || 
|-id=748 bgcolor=#d6d6d6
| 355748 ||  || — || April 7, 2008 || Catalina || CSS || TIR || align=right | 3.3 km || 
|-id=749 bgcolor=#d6d6d6
| 355749 ||  || — || April 26, 2008 || Kitt Peak || Spacewatch || — || align=right | 3.3 km || 
|-id=750 bgcolor=#d6d6d6
| 355750 ||  || — || April 26, 2008 || Kitt Peak || Spacewatch || ALA || align=right | 3.8 km || 
|-id=751 bgcolor=#d6d6d6
| 355751 ||  || — || May 6, 2008 || Siding Spring || SSS || EUP || align=right | 4.4 km || 
|-id=752 bgcolor=#FA8072
| 355752 ||  || — || May 4, 2008 || Siding Spring || SSS || H || align=right data-sort-value="0.92" | 920 m || 
|-id=753 bgcolor=#fefefe
| 355753 ||  || — || August 13, 2008 || Pla D'Arguines || R. Ferrando || FLO || align=right data-sort-value="0.53" | 530 m || 
|-id=754 bgcolor=#fefefe
| 355754 ||  || — || August 21, 2008 || Kitt Peak || Spacewatch || NYS || align=right data-sort-value="0.55" | 550 m || 
|-id=755 bgcolor=#C2FFFF
| 355755 ||  || — || July 29, 2008 || Kitt Peak || Spacewatch || L4 || align=right | 8.0 km || 
|-id=756 bgcolor=#C2FFFF
| 355756 ||  || — || August 21, 2008 || Kitt Peak || Spacewatch || L4ERY || align=right | 8.9 km || 
|-id=757 bgcolor=#C2FFFF
| 355757 ||  || — || August 21, 2008 || Kitt Peak || Spacewatch || L4 || align=right | 11 km || 
|-id=758 bgcolor=#C2FFFF
| 355758 ||  || — || August 24, 2008 || Kitt Peak || Spacewatch || L4 || align=right | 7.5 km || 
|-id=759 bgcolor=#fefefe
| 355759 || 2008 RE || — || September 1, 2008 || Hibiscus || S. F. Hönig, N. Teamo || — || align=right data-sort-value="0.84" | 840 m || 
|-id=760 bgcolor=#C2FFFF
| 355760 ||  || — || September 3, 2008 || Kitt Peak || Spacewatch || L4ERY || align=right | 10 km || 
|-id=761 bgcolor=#d6d6d6
| 355761 ||  || — || September 3, 2008 || Kitt Peak || Spacewatch || SHU3:2 || align=right | 7.4 km || 
|-id=762 bgcolor=#C2FFFF
| 355762 ||  || — || September 4, 2008 || Kitt Peak || Spacewatch || L4 || align=right | 9.9 km || 
|-id=763 bgcolor=#fefefe
| 355763 ||  || — || September 2, 2008 || Kitt Peak || Spacewatch || — || align=right data-sort-value="0.70" | 700 m || 
|-id=764 bgcolor=#fefefe
| 355764 ||  || — || September 2, 2008 || Kitt Peak || Spacewatch || NYS || align=right data-sort-value="0.63" | 630 m || 
|-id=765 bgcolor=#C2FFFF
| 355765 ||  || — || September 2, 2008 || Kitt Peak || Spacewatch || L4ERY || align=right | 11 km || 
|-id=766 bgcolor=#C2FFFF
| 355766 ||  || — || September 2, 2008 || Kitt Peak || Spacewatch || L4 || align=right | 8.0 km || 
|-id=767 bgcolor=#fefefe
| 355767 ||  || — || September 2, 2008 || Kitt Peak || Spacewatch || — || align=right data-sort-value="0.85" | 850 m || 
|-id=768 bgcolor=#C2FFFF
| 355768 ||  || — || September 3, 2008 || Kitt Peak || Spacewatch || L4 || align=right | 13 km || 
|-id=769 bgcolor=#C2FFFF
| 355769 ||  || — || September 4, 2008 || Kitt Peak || Spacewatch || L4ARK || align=right | 6.8 km || 
|-id=770 bgcolor=#FFC2E0
| 355770 ||  || — || September 11, 2008 || Bergisch Gladbac || W. Bickel || AMO || align=right | 1.2 km || 
|-id=771 bgcolor=#fefefe
| 355771 ||  || — || September 4, 2008 || Kitt Peak || Spacewatch || — || align=right data-sort-value="0.47" | 470 m || 
|-id=772 bgcolor=#fefefe
| 355772 ||  || — || September 9, 2008 || Kitt Peak || Spacewatch || — || align=right data-sort-value="0.83" | 830 m || 
|-id=773 bgcolor=#d6d6d6
| 355773 ||  || — || September 7, 2008 || Catalina || CSS || TIR || align=right | 3.2 km || 
|-id=774 bgcolor=#C2FFFF
| 355774 ||  || — || September 3, 2008 || Kitt Peak || Spacewatch || L4 || align=right | 7.7 km || 
|-id=775 bgcolor=#C2FFFF
| 355775 ||  || — || September 6, 2008 || Kitt Peak || Spacewatch || L4 || align=right | 7.4 km || 
|-id=776 bgcolor=#C2FFFF
| 355776 ||  || — || February 20, 2002 || Kitt Peak || Spacewatch || L4 || align=right | 7.2 km || 
|-id=777 bgcolor=#C2FFFF
| 355777 ||  || — || September 6, 2008 || Mount Lemmon || Mount Lemmon Survey || L4 || align=right | 7.7 km || 
|-id=778 bgcolor=#C2FFFF
| 355778 ||  || — || September 7, 2008 || Mount Lemmon || Mount Lemmon Survey || L4 || align=right | 9.5 km || 
|-id=779 bgcolor=#C2FFFF
| 355779 ||  || — || September 9, 2008 || Mount Lemmon || Mount Lemmon Survey || L4 || align=right | 8.6 km || 
|-id=780 bgcolor=#C2FFFF
| 355780 ||  || — || September 4, 2008 || Kitt Peak || Spacewatch || L4 || align=right | 8.2 km || 
|-id=781 bgcolor=#C2FFFF
| 355781 ||  || — || September 5, 2008 || Kitt Peak || Spacewatch || L4ARK || align=right | 9.5 km || 
|-id=782 bgcolor=#C2FFFF
| 355782 ||  || — || September 6, 2008 || Kitt Peak || Spacewatch || L4 || align=right | 8.1 km || 
|-id=783 bgcolor=#fefefe
| 355783 ||  || — || September 5, 2008 || Kitt Peak || Spacewatch || — || align=right data-sort-value="0.62" | 620 m || 
|-id=784 bgcolor=#fefefe
| 355784 ||  || — || September 7, 2008 || Catalina || CSS || — || align=right data-sort-value="0.70" | 700 m || 
|-id=785 bgcolor=#fefefe
| 355785 ||  || — || September 19, 2001 || Socorro || LINEAR || — || align=right data-sort-value="0.77" | 770 m || 
|-id=786 bgcolor=#fefefe
| 355786 ||  || — || September 20, 2008 || Mount Lemmon || Mount Lemmon Survey || — || align=right data-sort-value="0.73" | 730 m || 
|-id=787 bgcolor=#fefefe
| 355787 ||  || — || September 20, 2008 || Kitt Peak || Spacewatch || — || align=right data-sort-value="0.55" | 550 m || 
|-id=788 bgcolor=#C2FFFF
| 355788 ||  || — || August 23, 2008 || Kitt Peak || Spacewatch || L4 || align=right | 10 km || 
|-id=789 bgcolor=#fefefe
| 355789 ||  || — || September 20, 2008 || Kitt Peak || Spacewatch || — || align=right data-sort-value="0.91" | 910 m || 
|-id=790 bgcolor=#fefefe
| 355790 ||  || — || September 21, 2008 || Mount Lemmon || Mount Lemmon Survey || — || align=right data-sort-value="0.87" | 870 m || 
|-id=791 bgcolor=#C2FFFF
| 355791 ||  || — || September 20, 2008 || Kitt Peak || Spacewatch || L4 || align=right | 8.2 km || 
|-id=792 bgcolor=#fefefe
| 355792 ||  || — || September 20, 2008 || Kitt Peak || Spacewatch || — || align=right data-sort-value="0.79" | 790 m || 
|-id=793 bgcolor=#fefefe
| 355793 ||  || — || September 21, 2008 || Kitt Peak || Spacewatch || FLO || align=right data-sort-value="0.56" | 560 m || 
|-id=794 bgcolor=#fefefe
| 355794 ||  || — || September 21, 2008 || Kitt Peak || Spacewatch || — || align=right data-sort-value="0.71" | 710 m || 
|-id=795 bgcolor=#fefefe
| 355795 ||  || — || September 22, 2008 || Kitt Peak || Spacewatch || — || align=right data-sort-value="0.74" | 740 m || 
|-id=796 bgcolor=#fefefe
| 355796 ||  || — || September 22, 2008 || Mount Lemmon || Mount Lemmon Survey || — || align=right data-sort-value="0.95" | 950 m || 
|-id=797 bgcolor=#FA8072
| 355797 ||  || — || September 24, 2008 || Catalina || CSS || — || align=right data-sort-value="0.98" | 980 m || 
|-id=798 bgcolor=#fefefe
| 355798 ||  || — || September 22, 2008 || Socorro || LINEAR || — || align=right data-sort-value="0.80" | 800 m || 
|-id=799 bgcolor=#fefefe
| 355799 ||  || — || September 24, 2008 || Socorro || LINEAR || FLO || align=right data-sort-value="0.74" | 740 m || 
|-id=800 bgcolor=#fefefe
| 355800 ||  || — || September 28, 2008 || Socorro || LINEAR || — || align=right data-sort-value="0.83" | 830 m || 
|}

355801–355900 

|-bgcolor=#fefefe
| 355801 ||  || — || September 26, 2008 || Kitt Peak || Spacewatch || — || align=right data-sort-value="0.56" | 560 m || 
|-id=802 bgcolor=#fefefe
| 355802 ||  || — || September 29, 2008 || Catalina || CSS || — || align=right data-sort-value="0.87" | 870 m || 
|-id=803 bgcolor=#fefefe
| 355803 ||  || — || September 24, 2008 || Kitt Peak || Spacewatch || FLO || align=right data-sort-value="0.55" | 550 m || 
|-id=804 bgcolor=#fefefe
| 355804 ||  || — || September 21, 2008 || Kitt Peak || Spacewatch || — || align=right data-sort-value="0.71" | 710 m || 
|-id=805 bgcolor=#fefefe
| 355805 ||  || — || September 22, 2008 || Kitt Peak || Spacewatch || — || align=right data-sort-value="0.75" | 750 m || 
|-id=806 bgcolor=#fefefe
| 355806 ||  || — || September 23, 2008 || Kitt Peak || Spacewatch || — || align=right data-sort-value="0.67" | 670 m || 
|-id=807 bgcolor=#fefefe
| 355807 ||  || — || September 21, 2008 || Kitt Peak || Spacewatch || — || align=right data-sort-value="0.71" | 710 m || 
|-id=808 bgcolor=#C2FFFF
| 355808 ||  || — || September 23, 2008 || Kitt Peak || Spacewatch || L4 || align=right | 11 km || 
|-id=809 bgcolor=#C2FFFF
| 355809 ||  || — || September 24, 2008 || Mount Lemmon || Mount Lemmon Survey || L4ERY || align=right | 8.1 km || 
|-id=810 bgcolor=#C2FFFF
| 355810 ||  || — || April 4, 2003 || Kitt Peak || Spacewatch || L4 || align=right | 10 km || 
|-id=811 bgcolor=#fefefe
| 355811 ||  || — || September 24, 2008 || Kitt Peak || Spacewatch || V || align=right data-sort-value="0.68" | 680 m || 
|-id=812 bgcolor=#fefefe
| 355812 ||  || — || October 1, 2008 || Mount Lemmon || Mount Lemmon Survey || NYS || align=right data-sort-value="0.49" | 490 m || 
|-id=813 bgcolor=#C2FFFF
| 355813 ||  || — || October 2, 2008 || Kitt Peak || Spacewatch || L4 || align=right | 7.5 km || 
|-id=814 bgcolor=#C2FFFF
| 355814 ||  || — || October 1, 2008 || Mount Lemmon || Mount Lemmon Survey || L4ERY || align=right | 9.5 km || 
|-id=815 bgcolor=#fefefe
| 355815 ||  || — || October 1, 2008 || Kitt Peak || Spacewatch || NYS || align=right data-sort-value="0.52" | 520 m || 
|-id=816 bgcolor=#C2FFFF
| 355816 ||  || — || October 2, 2008 || Kitt Peak || Spacewatch || L4 || align=right | 8.6 km || 
|-id=817 bgcolor=#fefefe
| 355817 ||  || — || October 2, 2008 || Kitt Peak || Spacewatch || — || align=right data-sort-value="0.67" | 670 m || 
|-id=818 bgcolor=#C2FFFF
| 355818 ||  || — || October 2, 2008 || Mount Lemmon || Mount Lemmon Survey || L4 || align=right | 7.3 km || 
|-id=819 bgcolor=#fefefe
| 355819 ||  || — || October 3, 2008 || La Sagra || OAM Obs. || — || align=right data-sort-value="0.69" | 690 m || 
|-id=820 bgcolor=#C2FFFF
| 355820 ||  || — || October 6, 2008 || Kitt Peak || Spacewatch || L4ERY || align=right | 8.1 km || 
|-id=821 bgcolor=#fefefe
| 355821 ||  || — || October 6, 2008 || Kitt Peak || Spacewatch || FLO || align=right data-sort-value="0.54" | 540 m || 
|-id=822 bgcolor=#C2FFFF
| 355822 ||  || — || September 3, 2008 || Kitt Peak || Spacewatch || L4 || align=right | 8.6 km || 
|-id=823 bgcolor=#fefefe
| 355823 ||  || — || October 6, 2008 || Catalina || CSS || — || align=right data-sort-value="0.88" | 880 m || 
|-id=824 bgcolor=#fefefe
| 355824 ||  || — || October 6, 2008 || Catalina || CSS || — || align=right | 1.0 km || 
|-id=825 bgcolor=#fefefe
| 355825 ||  || — || October 6, 2008 || Mount Lemmon || Mount Lemmon Survey || — || align=right data-sort-value="0.51" | 510 m || 
|-id=826 bgcolor=#fefefe
| 355826 ||  || — || October 8, 2008 || Mount Lemmon || Mount Lemmon Survey || — || align=right data-sort-value="0.66" | 660 m || 
|-id=827 bgcolor=#fefefe
| 355827 ||  || — || October 10, 2008 || Kitt Peak || Spacewatch || NYS || align=right data-sort-value="0.60" | 600 m || 
|-id=828 bgcolor=#fefefe
| 355828 ||  || — || October 1, 2008 || Kitt Peak || Spacewatch || — || align=right data-sort-value="0.78" | 780 m || 
|-id=829 bgcolor=#fefefe
| 355829 ||  || — || October 8, 2008 || Kitt Peak || Spacewatch || NYS || align=right data-sort-value="0.83" | 830 m || 
|-id=830 bgcolor=#C2FFFF
| 355830 ||  || — || March 21, 2002 || Kitt Peak || Spacewatch || L4 || align=right | 8.7 km || 
|-id=831 bgcolor=#fefefe
| 355831 ||  || — || October 2, 2008 || Catalina || CSS || — || align=right data-sort-value="0.94" | 940 m || 
|-id=832 bgcolor=#fefefe
| 355832 ||  || — || October 3, 2008 || Socorro || LINEAR || — || align=right data-sort-value="0.75" | 750 m || 
|-id=833 bgcolor=#fefefe
| 355833 ||  || — || October 7, 2008 || Catalina || CSS || FLO || align=right data-sort-value="0.62" | 620 m || 
|-id=834 bgcolor=#fefefe
| 355834 ||  || — || October 25, 2008 || Goodricke-Pigott || R. A. Tucker || — || align=right data-sort-value="0.86" | 860 m || 
|-id=835 bgcolor=#C2FFFF
| 355835 ||  || — || October 17, 2008 || Kitt Peak || Spacewatch || L4ARK || align=right | 9.1 km || 
|-id=836 bgcolor=#C2FFFF
| 355836 ||  || — || September 21, 2008 || Kitt Peak || Spacewatch || L4 || align=right | 9.8 km || 
|-id=837 bgcolor=#fefefe
| 355837 ||  || — || October 20, 2008 || Kitt Peak || Spacewatch || — || align=right data-sort-value="0.79" | 790 m || 
|-id=838 bgcolor=#fefefe
| 355838 ||  || — || October 20, 2008 || Kitt Peak || Spacewatch || V || align=right data-sort-value="0.70" | 700 m || 
|-id=839 bgcolor=#E9E9E9
| 355839 ||  || — || October 20, 2008 || Kitt Peak || Spacewatch || — || align=right | 1.9 km || 
|-id=840 bgcolor=#fefefe
| 355840 ||  || — || October 20, 2008 || Kitt Peak || Spacewatch || FLO || align=right data-sort-value="0.80" | 800 m || 
|-id=841 bgcolor=#fefefe
| 355841 ||  || — || September 24, 2008 || Mount Lemmon || Mount Lemmon Survey || — || align=right data-sort-value="0.80" | 800 m || 
|-id=842 bgcolor=#C2FFFF
| 355842 ||  || — || October 21, 2008 || Kitt Peak || Spacewatch || L4 || align=right | 8.7 km || 
|-id=843 bgcolor=#fefefe
| 355843 ||  || — || October 25, 2008 || Dauban || F. Kugel || — || align=right | 1.2 km || 
|-id=844 bgcolor=#fefefe
| 355844 ||  || — || October 27, 2008 || Socorro || LINEAR || — || align=right | 2.0 km || 
|-id=845 bgcolor=#fefefe
| 355845 ||  || — || September 7, 2008 || Catalina || CSS || — || align=right data-sort-value="0.82" | 820 m || 
|-id=846 bgcolor=#fefefe
| 355846 ||  || — || September 23, 2008 || Kitt Peak || Spacewatch || — || align=right data-sort-value="0.81" | 810 m || 
|-id=847 bgcolor=#fefefe
| 355847 ||  || — || October 20, 2008 || Mount Lemmon || Mount Lemmon Survey || — || align=right data-sort-value="0.79" | 790 m || 
|-id=848 bgcolor=#E9E9E9
| 355848 ||  || — || October 21, 2008 || Kitt Peak || Spacewatch || — || align=right | 1.2 km || 
|-id=849 bgcolor=#C2FFFF
| 355849 ||  || — || August 24, 2008 || Kitt Peak || Spacewatch || L4ERY || align=right | 9.0 km || 
|-id=850 bgcolor=#fefefe
| 355850 ||  || — || October 23, 2008 || Kitt Peak || Spacewatch || FLO || align=right data-sort-value="0.57" | 570 m || 
|-id=851 bgcolor=#fefefe
| 355851 ||  || — || October 23, 2008 || Kitt Peak || Spacewatch || — || align=right data-sort-value="0.72" | 720 m || 
|-id=852 bgcolor=#fefefe
| 355852 ||  || — || October 23, 2008 || Mount Lemmon || Mount Lemmon Survey || MAS || align=right data-sort-value="0.72" | 720 m || 
|-id=853 bgcolor=#fefefe
| 355853 ||  || — || October 23, 2008 || Mount Lemmon || Mount Lemmon Survey || — || align=right data-sort-value="0.91" | 910 m || 
|-id=854 bgcolor=#fefefe
| 355854 ||  || — || October 24, 2008 || Mount Lemmon || Mount Lemmon Survey || NYS || align=right data-sort-value="0.60" | 600 m || 
|-id=855 bgcolor=#fefefe
| 355855 ||  || — || October 27, 2008 || Socorro || LINEAR || — || align=right | 1.0 km || 
|-id=856 bgcolor=#fefefe
| 355856 ||  || — || October 25, 2008 || Kitt Peak || Spacewatch || — || align=right data-sort-value="0.58" | 580 m || 
|-id=857 bgcolor=#C2FFFF
| 355857 ||  || — || October 26, 2008 || Kitt Peak || Spacewatch || L4 || align=right | 9.5 km || 
|-id=858 bgcolor=#fefefe
| 355858 ||  || — || October 26, 2008 || Kitt Peak || Spacewatch || — || align=right | 1.1 km || 
|-id=859 bgcolor=#fefefe
| 355859 ||  || — || October 26, 2008 || Kitt Peak || Spacewatch || — || align=right data-sort-value="0.89" | 890 m || 
|-id=860 bgcolor=#fefefe
| 355860 ||  || — || October 27, 2008 || Kitt Peak || Spacewatch || MAS || align=right data-sort-value="0.68" | 680 m || 
|-id=861 bgcolor=#fefefe
| 355861 ||  || — || October 27, 2008 || Kitt Peak || Spacewatch || — || align=right data-sort-value="0.71" | 710 m || 
|-id=862 bgcolor=#E9E9E9
| 355862 ||  || — || October 28, 2008 || Kitt Peak || Spacewatch || — || align=right data-sort-value="0.97" | 970 m || 
|-id=863 bgcolor=#fefefe
| 355863 ||  || — || September 29, 2008 || Mount Lemmon || Mount Lemmon Survey || — || align=right data-sort-value="0.87" | 870 m || 
|-id=864 bgcolor=#fefefe
| 355864 ||  || — || October 28, 2008 || Kitt Peak || Spacewatch || V || align=right data-sort-value="0.67" | 670 m || 
|-id=865 bgcolor=#fefefe
| 355865 ||  || — || October 28, 2008 || Kitt Peak || Spacewatch || — || align=right data-sort-value="0.92" | 920 m || 
|-id=866 bgcolor=#fefefe
| 355866 ||  || — || October 30, 2008 || Kitt Peak || Spacewatch || FLO || align=right data-sort-value="0.59" | 590 m || 
|-id=867 bgcolor=#fefefe
| 355867 ||  || — || October 30, 2008 || Kitt Peak || Spacewatch || — || align=right data-sort-value="0.94" | 940 m || 
|-id=868 bgcolor=#fefefe
| 355868 ||  || — || October 30, 2008 || Kitt Peak || Spacewatch || NYS || align=right data-sort-value="0.74" | 740 m || 
|-id=869 bgcolor=#fefefe
| 355869 ||  || — || October 31, 2008 || Kitt Peak || Spacewatch || — || align=right data-sort-value="0.71" | 710 m || 
|-id=870 bgcolor=#fefefe
| 355870 ||  || — || October 20, 2008 || Kitt Peak || Spacewatch || — || align=right data-sort-value="0.76" | 760 m || 
|-id=871 bgcolor=#fefefe
| 355871 ||  || — || October 27, 2008 || Mount Lemmon || Mount Lemmon Survey || MAS || align=right data-sort-value="0.65" | 650 m || 
|-id=872 bgcolor=#fefefe
| 355872 ||  || — || October 10, 2008 || Mount Lemmon || Mount Lemmon Survey || — || align=right data-sort-value="0.83" | 830 m || 
|-id=873 bgcolor=#FA8072
| 355873 ||  || — || November 2, 2008 || Socorro || LINEAR || — || align=right | 1.0 km || 
|-id=874 bgcolor=#fefefe
| 355874 ||  || — || November 1, 2008 || Kitt Peak || Spacewatch || — || align=right data-sort-value="0.81" | 810 m || 
|-id=875 bgcolor=#fefefe
| 355875 ||  || — || November 1, 2008 || Kitt Peak || Spacewatch || NYS || align=right data-sort-value="0.66" | 660 m || 
|-id=876 bgcolor=#fefefe
| 355876 ||  || — || November 2, 2008 || Kitt Peak || Spacewatch || NYS || align=right data-sort-value="0.60" | 600 m || 
|-id=877 bgcolor=#fefefe
| 355877 ||  || — || November 2, 2008 || Catalina || CSS || — || align=right | 1.2 km || 
|-id=878 bgcolor=#fefefe
| 355878 ||  || — || November 2, 2008 || Mount Lemmon || Mount Lemmon Survey || — || align=right | 1.7 km || 
|-id=879 bgcolor=#fefefe
| 355879 ||  || — || November 2, 2008 || Kitt Peak || Spacewatch || FLO || align=right data-sort-value="0.63" | 630 m || 
|-id=880 bgcolor=#fefefe
| 355880 ||  || — || September 23, 2008 || Catalina || CSS || — || align=right data-sort-value="0.91" | 910 m || 
|-id=881 bgcolor=#fefefe
| 355881 ||  || — || November 4, 2008 || Kitt Peak || Spacewatch || — || align=right data-sort-value="0.95" | 950 m || 
|-id=882 bgcolor=#fefefe
| 355882 ||  || — || November 3, 2008 || Catalina || CSS || FLO || align=right data-sort-value="0.70" | 700 m || 
|-id=883 bgcolor=#fefefe
| 355883 ||  || — || November 8, 2008 || Mount Lemmon || Mount Lemmon Survey || MAS || align=right data-sort-value="0.90" | 900 m || 
|-id=884 bgcolor=#fefefe
| 355884 ||  || — || November 7, 2008 || Kitt Peak || Spacewatch || V || align=right data-sort-value="0.73" | 730 m || 
|-id=885 bgcolor=#fefefe
| 355885 ||  || — || November 17, 2008 || Kitt Peak || Spacewatch || — || align=right data-sort-value="0.64" | 640 m || 
|-id=886 bgcolor=#fefefe
| 355886 ||  || — || November 17, 2008 || Kitt Peak || Spacewatch || — || align=right data-sort-value="0.86" | 860 m || 
|-id=887 bgcolor=#fefefe
| 355887 ||  || — || November 18, 2008 || Catalina || CSS || NYS || align=right data-sort-value="0.63" | 630 m || 
|-id=888 bgcolor=#fefefe
| 355888 ||  || — || October 31, 2008 || Kitt Peak || Spacewatch || — || align=right data-sort-value="0.92" | 920 m || 
|-id=889 bgcolor=#fefefe
| 355889 ||  || — || November 17, 2008 || Kitt Peak || Spacewatch || V || align=right data-sort-value="0.69" | 690 m || 
|-id=890 bgcolor=#fefefe
| 355890 ||  || — || November 17, 2008 || Kitt Peak || Spacewatch || — || align=right data-sort-value="0.78" | 780 m || 
|-id=891 bgcolor=#fefefe
| 355891 ||  || — || November 17, 2008 || Kitt Peak || Spacewatch || — || align=right data-sort-value="0.75" | 750 m || 
|-id=892 bgcolor=#fefefe
| 355892 ||  || — || November 17, 2008 || Kitt Peak || Spacewatch || — || align=right data-sort-value="0.66" | 660 m || 
|-id=893 bgcolor=#fefefe
| 355893 ||  || — || November 6, 2008 || Mount Lemmon || Mount Lemmon Survey || V || align=right data-sort-value="0.69" | 690 m || 
|-id=894 bgcolor=#E9E9E9
| 355894 ||  || — || September 27, 2008 || Mount Lemmon || Mount Lemmon Survey || MIS || align=right | 2.7 km || 
|-id=895 bgcolor=#fefefe
| 355895 ||  || — || November 18, 2008 || Kitt Peak || Spacewatch || — || align=right | 1.1 km || 
|-id=896 bgcolor=#fefefe
| 355896 ||  || — || November 18, 2008 || Kitt Peak || Spacewatch || NYS || align=right data-sort-value="0.85" | 850 m || 
|-id=897 bgcolor=#E9E9E9
| 355897 ||  || — || November 22, 2008 || La Sagra || OAM Obs. || — || align=right | 1.5 km || 
|-id=898 bgcolor=#fefefe
| 355898 ||  || — || November 18, 2008 || Kitt Peak || Spacewatch || FLO || align=right data-sort-value="0.59" | 590 m || 
|-id=899 bgcolor=#fefefe
| 355899 ||  || — || November 18, 2008 || Kitt Peak || Spacewatch || MAS || align=right data-sort-value="0.68" | 680 m || 
|-id=900 bgcolor=#fefefe
| 355900 ||  || — || November 18, 2008 || Kitt Peak || Spacewatch || MAS || align=right data-sort-value="0.86" | 860 m || 
|}

355901–356000 

|-bgcolor=#fefefe
| 355901 ||  || — || November 19, 2008 || Mount Lemmon || Mount Lemmon Survey || MAS || align=right data-sort-value="0.64" | 640 m || 
|-id=902 bgcolor=#E9E9E9
| 355902 ||  || — || November 19, 2008 || Mount Lemmon || Mount Lemmon Survey || — || align=right | 1.5 km || 
|-id=903 bgcolor=#fefefe
| 355903 ||  || — || November 23, 2008 || La Sagra || OAM Obs. || V || align=right data-sort-value="0.72" | 720 m || 
|-id=904 bgcolor=#fefefe
| 355904 ||  || — || November 27, 2008 || La Sagra || OAM Obs. || — || align=right data-sort-value="0.99" | 990 m || 
|-id=905 bgcolor=#fefefe
| 355905 ||  || — || November 30, 2008 || Catalina || CSS || FLO || align=right data-sort-value="0.70" | 700 m || 
|-id=906 bgcolor=#fefefe
| 355906 ||  || — || November 30, 2008 || Kitt Peak || Spacewatch || NYS || align=right data-sort-value="0.75" | 750 m || 
|-id=907 bgcolor=#fefefe
| 355907 ||  || — || November 22, 2008 || Kitt Peak || Spacewatch || — || align=right data-sort-value="0.76" | 760 m || 
|-id=908 bgcolor=#fefefe
| 355908 ||  || — || December 2, 2008 || Mount Lemmon || Mount Lemmon Survey || FLO || align=right data-sort-value="0.65" | 650 m || 
|-id=909 bgcolor=#fefefe
| 355909 ||  || — || December 1, 2008 || Kitt Peak || Spacewatch || FLO || align=right data-sort-value="0.73" | 730 m || 
|-id=910 bgcolor=#fefefe
| 355910 ||  || — || December 2, 2008 || Kitt Peak || Spacewatch || V || align=right data-sort-value="0.57" | 570 m || 
|-id=911 bgcolor=#fefefe
| 355911 ||  || — || December 2, 2008 || Kitt Peak || Spacewatch || NYS || align=right data-sort-value="0.70" | 700 m || 
|-id=912 bgcolor=#fefefe
| 355912 ||  || — || November 3, 2004 || Palomar || NEAT || V || align=right | 1.1 km || 
|-id=913 bgcolor=#fefefe
| 355913 ||  || — || December 3, 2008 || Catalina || CSS || — || align=right | 1.0 km || 
|-id=914 bgcolor=#E9E9E9
| 355914 ||  || — || December 4, 2008 || Kitt Peak || Spacewatch || — || align=right | 1.4 km || 
|-id=915 bgcolor=#fefefe
| 355915 ||  || — || December 3, 2008 || Mount Lemmon || Mount Lemmon Survey || — || align=right | 1.3 km || 
|-id=916 bgcolor=#fefefe
| 355916 ||  || — || December 20, 2008 || La Sagra || OAM Obs. || — || align=right | 1.1 km || 
|-id=917 bgcolor=#fefefe
| 355917 ||  || — || December 21, 2008 || Mayhill || A. Lowe || — || align=right data-sort-value="0.89" | 890 m || 
|-id=918 bgcolor=#fefefe
| 355918 ||  || — || November 20, 2008 || Kitt Peak || Spacewatch || — || align=right data-sort-value="0.94" | 940 m || 
|-id=919 bgcolor=#fefefe
| 355919 ||  || — || December 21, 2008 || Kitt Peak || Spacewatch || — || align=right | 1.1 km || 
|-id=920 bgcolor=#fefefe
| 355920 ||  || — || December 21, 2008 || Mount Lemmon || Mount Lemmon Survey || — || align=right | 1.8 km || 
|-id=921 bgcolor=#fefefe
| 355921 ||  || — || November 30, 2008 || Kitt Peak || Spacewatch || — || align=right data-sort-value="0.98" | 980 m || 
|-id=922 bgcolor=#fefefe
| 355922 ||  || — || December 21, 2008 || Mount Lemmon || Mount Lemmon Survey || NYS || align=right data-sort-value="0.92" | 920 m || 
|-id=923 bgcolor=#E9E9E9
| 355923 ||  || — || December 24, 2008 || Piszkéstető || K. Sárneczky || — || align=right | 1.1 km || 
|-id=924 bgcolor=#fefefe
| 355924 ||  || — || December 29, 2008 || Tzec Maun || F. Tozzi || — || align=right | 1.0 km || 
|-id=925 bgcolor=#fefefe
| 355925 ||  || — || December 27, 2008 || Bergisch Gladbac || W. Bickel || NYS || align=right data-sort-value="0.68" | 680 m || 
|-id=926 bgcolor=#fefefe
| 355926 ||  || — || December 29, 2008 || Kitt Peak || Spacewatch || V || align=right data-sort-value="0.61" | 610 m || 
|-id=927 bgcolor=#fefefe
| 355927 ||  || — || December 29, 2008 || Mount Lemmon || Mount Lemmon Survey || NYS || align=right data-sort-value="0.84" | 840 m || 
|-id=928 bgcolor=#fefefe
| 355928 ||  || — || March 24, 2006 || Kitt Peak || Spacewatch || NYS || align=right data-sort-value="0.83" | 830 m || 
|-id=929 bgcolor=#fefefe
| 355929 ||  || — || December 29, 2008 || Mount Lemmon || Mount Lemmon Survey || — || align=right data-sort-value="0.69" | 690 m || 
|-id=930 bgcolor=#fefefe
| 355930 ||  || — || December 29, 2008 || Mount Lemmon || Mount Lemmon Survey || MAS || align=right data-sort-value="0.88" | 880 m || 
|-id=931 bgcolor=#fefefe
| 355931 ||  || — || December 29, 2008 || Mount Lemmon || Mount Lemmon Survey || NYS || align=right | 1.0 km || 
|-id=932 bgcolor=#fefefe
| 355932 ||  || — || December 29, 2008 || Mount Lemmon || Mount Lemmon Survey || V || align=right data-sort-value="0.80" | 800 m || 
|-id=933 bgcolor=#fefefe
| 355933 ||  || — || December 29, 2008 || Mount Lemmon || Mount Lemmon Survey || V || align=right data-sort-value="0.84" | 840 m || 
|-id=934 bgcolor=#fefefe
| 355934 ||  || — || November 11, 2004 || Kitt Peak || Spacewatch || — || align=right | 1.0 km || 
|-id=935 bgcolor=#fefefe
| 355935 ||  || — || December 30, 2008 || Kitt Peak || Spacewatch || MAS || align=right data-sort-value="0.66" | 660 m || 
|-id=936 bgcolor=#fefefe
| 355936 ||  || — || May 5, 2006 || Anderson Mesa || LONEOS || — || align=right | 1.1 km || 
|-id=937 bgcolor=#fefefe
| 355937 ||  || — || December 30, 2008 || Kitt Peak || Spacewatch || — || align=right data-sort-value="0.85" | 850 m || 
|-id=938 bgcolor=#fefefe
| 355938 ||  || — || December 30, 2008 || Kitt Peak || Spacewatch || FLO || align=right data-sort-value="0.72" | 720 m || 
|-id=939 bgcolor=#fefefe
| 355939 ||  || — || December 30, 2008 || Mount Lemmon || Mount Lemmon Survey || — || align=right data-sort-value="0.88" | 880 m || 
|-id=940 bgcolor=#fefefe
| 355940 ||  || — || December 30, 2008 || Mount Lemmon || Mount Lemmon Survey || NYS || align=right data-sort-value="0.70" | 700 m || 
|-id=941 bgcolor=#fefefe
| 355941 ||  || — || December 29, 2008 || Kitt Peak || Spacewatch || — || align=right data-sort-value="0.82" | 820 m || 
|-id=942 bgcolor=#fefefe
| 355942 ||  || — || December 29, 2008 || Kitt Peak || Spacewatch || NYS || align=right data-sort-value="0.69" | 690 m || 
|-id=943 bgcolor=#fefefe
| 355943 ||  || — || December 29, 2008 || Kitt Peak || Spacewatch || NYS || align=right data-sort-value="0.95" | 950 m || 
|-id=944 bgcolor=#fefefe
| 355944 ||  || — || December 29, 2008 || Kitt Peak || Spacewatch || — || align=right | 1.2 km || 
|-id=945 bgcolor=#fefefe
| 355945 ||  || — || December 29, 2008 || Kitt Peak || Spacewatch || V || align=right data-sort-value="0.73" | 730 m || 
|-id=946 bgcolor=#fefefe
| 355946 ||  || — || December 29, 2008 || Kitt Peak || Spacewatch || MAS || align=right data-sort-value="0.77" | 770 m || 
|-id=947 bgcolor=#fefefe
| 355947 ||  || — || December 29, 2008 || Kitt Peak || Spacewatch || NYS || align=right data-sort-value="0.96" | 960 m || 
|-id=948 bgcolor=#fefefe
| 355948 ||  || — || December 29, 2008 || Kitt Peak || Spacewatch || — || align=right data-sort-value="0.75" | 750 m || 
|-id=949 bgcolor=#fefefe
| 355949 ||  || — || December 30, 2008 || Kitt Peak || Spacewatch || ERI || align=right | 1.9 km || 
|-id=950 bgcolor=#fefefe
| 355950 ||  || — || December 30, 2008 || Kitt Peak || Spacewatch || — || align=right | 1.1 km || 
|-id=951 bgcolor=#fefefe
| 355951 ||  || — || December 30, 2008 || Kitt Peak || Spacewatch || NYS || align=right data-sort-value="0.83" | 830 m || 
|-id=952 bgcolor=#fefefe
| 355952 ||  || — || December 30, 2008 || Kitt Peak || Spacewatch || — || align=right | 1.2 km || 
|-id=953 bgcolor=#fefefe
| 355953 ||  || — || December 30, 2008 || Kitt Peak || Spacewatch || — || align=right data-sort-value="0.86" | 860 m || 
|-id=954 bgcolor=#fefefe
| 355954 ||  || — || December 31, 2008 || Kitt Peak || Spacewatch || FLO || align=right data-sort-value="0.72" | 720 m || 
|-id=955 bgcolor=#fefefe
| 355955 ||  || — || December 30, 2008 || Kitt Peak || Spacewatch || — || align=right | 1.2 km || 
|-id=956 bgcolor=#fefefe
| 355956 ||  || — || December 30, 2008 || Kitt Peak || Spacewatch || — || align=right | 1.1 km || 
|-id=957 bgcolor=#E9E9E9
| 355957 ||  || — || December 31, 2008 || Kitt Peak || Spacewatch || GER || align=right | 2.1 km || 
|-id=958 bgcolor=#fefefe
| 355958 ||  || — || December 21, 2008 || Mount Lemmon || Mount Lemmon Survey || — || align=right data-sort-value="0.89" | 890 m || 
|-id=959 bgcolor=#E9E9E9
| 355959 ||  || — || December 29, 2008 || Mount Lemmon || Mount Lemmon Survey || — || align=right data-sort-value="0.80" | 800 m || 
|-id=960 bgcolor=#fefefe
| 355960 ||  || — || December 21, 2008 || Mount Lemmon || Mount Lemmon Survey || — || align=right data-sort-value="0.98" | 980 m || 
|-id=961 bgcolor=#fefefe
| 355961 ||  || — || December 22, 2008 || Kitt Peak || Spacewatch || V || align=right data-sort-value="0.80" | 800 m || 
|-id=962 bgcolor=#fefefe
| 355962 ||  || — || December 22, 2008 || Kitt Peak || Spacewatch || NYS || align=right data-sort-value="0.79" | 790 m || 
|-id=963 bgcolor=#fefefe
| 355963 ||  || — || December 29, 2008 || Kitt Peak || Spacewatch || NYS || align=right data-sort-value="0.76" | 760 m || 
|-id=964 bgcolor=#fefefe
| 355964 ||  || — || December 29, 2008 || Mount Lemmon || Mount Lemmon Survey || — || align=right | 1.0 km || 
|-id=965 bgcolor=#fefefe
| 355965 ||  || — || December 21, 2008 || Socorro || LINEAR || NYS || align=right data-sort-value="0.74" | 740 m || 
|-id=966 bgcolor=#fefefe
| 355966 ||  || — || December 21, 2008 || Catalina || CSS || — || align=right | 1.4 km || 
|-id=967 bgcolor=#E9E9E9
| 355967 ||  || — || December 31, 2008 || Kitt Peak || Spacewatch || — || align=right | 1.6 km || 
|-id=968 bgcolor=#fefefe
| 355968 ||  || — || November 8, 2008 || Mount Lemmon || Mount Lemmon Survey || — || align=right | 1.1 km || 
|-id=969 bgcolor=#E9E9E9
| 355969 ||  || — || November 14, 1999 || Socorro || LINEAR || — || align=right | 1.4 km || 
|-id=970 bgcolor=#fefefe
| 355970 ||  || — || October 24, 2008 || Mount Lemmon || Mount Lemmon Survey || — || align=right | 1.1 km || 
|-id=971 bgcolor=#fefefe
| 355971 ||  || — || January 2, 2009 || Mount Lemmon || Mount Lemmon Survey || — || align=right data-sort-value="0.75" | 750 m || 
|-id=972 bgcolor=#fefefe
| 355972 ||  || — || January 2, 2009 || Mount Lemmon || Mount Lemmon Survey || — || align=right | 1.0 km || 
|-id=973 bgcolor=#fefefe
| 355973 ||  || — || January 2, 2009 || Mount Lemmon || Mount Lemmon Survey || V || align=right | 1.0 km || 
|-id=974 bgcolor=#fefefe
| 355974 ||  || — || January 2, 2009 || Mount Lemmon || Mount Lemmon Survey || — || align=right | 1.0 km || 
|-id=975 bgcolor=#fefefe
| 355975 ||  || — || January 3, 2009 || Kitt Peak || Spacewatch || MAS || align=right data-sort-value="0.77" | 770 m || 
|-id=976 bgcolor=#fefefe
| 355976 ||  || — || January 3, 2009 || Kitt Peak || Spacewatch || NYS || align=right data-sort-value="0.68" | 680 m || 
|-id=977 bgcolor=#fefefe
| 355977 ||  || — || December 22, 2008 || Kitt Peak || Spacewatch || NYS || align=right data-sort-value="0.67" | 670 m || 
|-id=978 bgcolor=#fefefe
| 355978 ||  || — || January 2, 2009 || Mount Lemmon || Mount Lemmon Survey || — || align=right | 2.8 km || 
|-id=979 bgcolor=#fefefe
| 355979 ||  || — || January 8, 2009 || Kitt Peak || Spacewatch || MAS || align=right data-sort-value="0.78" | 780 m || 
|-id=980 bgcolor=#fefefe
| 355980 ||  || — || January 15, 2009 || Kitt Peak || Spacewatch || — || align=right | 1.0 km || 
|-id=981 bgcolor=#fefefe
| 355981 ||  || — || December 22, 2008 || Mount Lemmon || Mount Lemmon Survey || NYS || align=right data-sort-value="0.77" | 770 m || 
|-id=982 bgcolor=#E9E9E9
| 355982 ||  || — || January 2, 2009 || Mount Lemmon || Mount Lemmon Survey || — || align=right | 2.4 km || 
|-id=983 bgcolor=#fefefe
| 355983 ||  || — || January 2, 2009 || Mount Lemmon || Mount Lemmon Survey || — || align=right | 1.0 km || 
|-id=984 bgcolor=#E9E9E9
| 355984 ||  || — || January 3, 2009 || Mount Lemmon || Mount Lemmon Survey || — || align=right | 1.6 km || 
|-id=985 bgcolor=#E9E9E9
| 355985 ||  || — || January 8, 2009 || Kitt Peak || Spacewatch || — || align=right | 2.2 km || 
|-id=986 bgcolor=#fefefe
| 355986 ||  || — || January 2, 2009 || Mount Lemmon || Mount Lemmon Survey || — || align=right data-sort-value="0.94" | 940 m || 
|-id=987 bgcolor=#E9E9E9
| 355987 ||  || — || January 3, 2009 || Mount Lemmon || Mount Lemmon Survey || — || align=right | 2.2 km || 
|-id=988 bgcolor=#E9E9E9
| 355988 ||  || — || January 3, 2009 || Kitt Peak || Spacewatch || — || align=right data-sort-value="0.89" | 890 m || 
|-id=989 bgcolor=#fefefe
| 355989 ||  || — || October 26, 2008 || Mount Lemmon || Mount Lemmon Survey || — || align=right | 1.2 km || 
|-id=990 bgcolor=#fefefe
| 355990 ||  || — || September 14, 2007 || Mount Lemmon || Mount Lemmon Survey || — || align=right | 1.3 km || 
|-id=991 bgcolor=#E9E9E9
| 355991 ||  || — || January 21, 2009 || Mayhill || A. Lowe || JUN || align=right | 1.2 km || 
|-id=992 bgcolor=#fefefe
| 355992 ||  || — || January 25, 2009 || Mayhill || A. Lowe || — || align=right | 1.1 km || 
|-id=993 bgcolor=#fefefe
| 355993 ||  || — || January 20, 2009 || Socorro || LINEAR || — || align=right | 1.1 km || 
|-id=994 bgcolor=#fefefe
| 355994 ||  || — || January 29, 2009 || Mayhill || A. Lowe || — || align=right | 1.0 km || 
|-id=995 bgcolor=#fefefe
| 355995 ||  || — || January 17, 2009 || Mount Lemmon || Mount Lemmon Survey || NYS || align=right data-sort-value="0.79" | 790 m || 
|-id=996 bgcolor=#E9E9E9
| 355996 ||  || — || January 13, 2005 || Kitt Peak || Spacewatch || — || align=right data-sort-value="0.89" | 890 m || 
|-id=997 bgcolor=#E9E9E9
| 355997 ||  || — || January 16, 2009 || Kitt Peak || Spacewatch || — || align=right | 1.7 km || 
|-id=998 bgcolor=#fefefe
| 355998 ||  || — || January 16, 2009 || Mount Lemmon || Mount Lemmon Survey || MAS || align=right data-sort-value="0.88" | 880 m || 
|-id=999 bgcolor=#fefefe
| 355999 ||  || — || January 16, 2009 || Mount Lemmon || Mount Lemmon Survey || NYS || align=right data-sort-value="0.78" | 780 m || 
|-id=000 bgcolor=#E9E9E9
| 356000 ||  || — || December 30, 2008 || Mount Lemmon || Mount Lemmon Survey || — || align=right | 1.0 km || 
|}

References

External links 
 Discovery Circumstances: Numbered Minor Planets (355001)–(360000) (IAU Minor Planet Center)

0355